= Abolitionism in the United States =

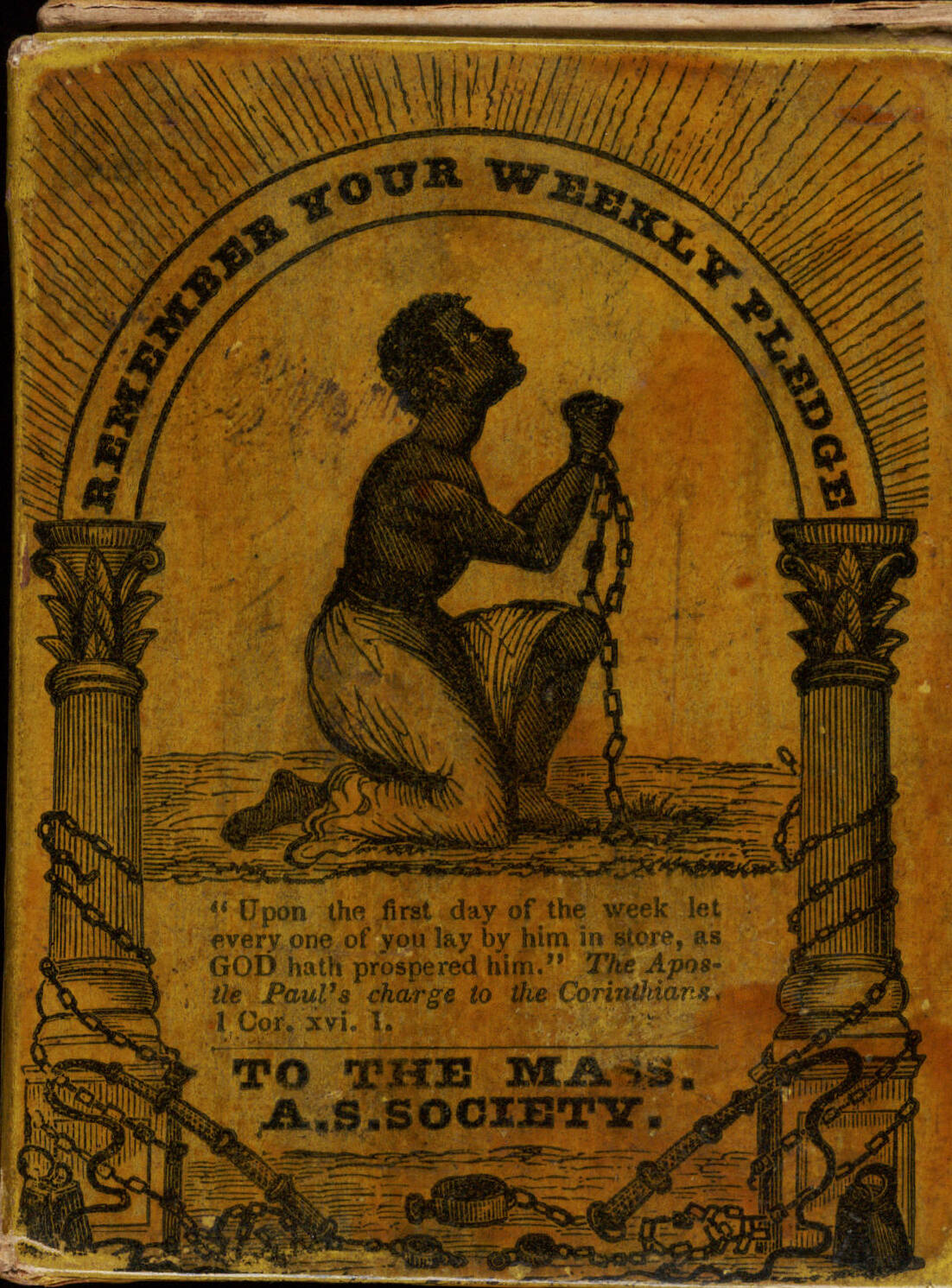
Collection box for the Massachusetts Anti-Slavery Society, c. 1850, design partly based on the Wedgwood anti-slavery medallion

In the United States, abolitionism, the movement that sought to end chattel slavery in the country, was active from the colonial era until the American Civil War, the end of which brought about the abolition of American Chattel Slavery, except as punishment for a crime, through the Thirteenth Amendment to the United States Constitution (ratified 1865).

The anti-slavery movement originated during the Age of Enlightenment, focused on ending the transatlantic slave trade. In Colonial America, a few German Quakers issued the 1688 Germantown Quaker Petition Against Slavery, which marked the beginning of the American abolitionist movement. Before the Revolutionary War, evangelical colonists were the primary advocates for the opposition to slavery and the slave trade, doing so on the basis of humanitarian ethics. Still, others such as James Oglethorpe, the founder of the colony of Georgia, also retained political motivations for the removal of slavery. Prohibiting slavery through the 1735 Georgia Experiment in part to prevent Spanish partnership with Georgia's runaway slaves, Oglethorpe eventually revoked the act in 1750 after the Spanish's defeat in the Battle of Bloody Marsh eight years prior.

During the Revolutionary era, all states abolished the international slave trade, but South Carolina reversed its decision. Between the Revolutionary War and 1804, laws, constitutions, or court decisions in each of the Northern states provided for the gradual or immediate abolition of slavery. (Note: Specifically, the Northern states adopted anti-slavery policies or court decisions as follows: Vermont (1777, before it had become a U.S. state); Pennsylvania (1780); Massachusetts (1783); New Hampshire (1783); Connecticut (1784); Rhode Island (1784); New York (1799); Ohio (1802) (although the Northwest Ordinance of 1787 had already banned slavery in the lands that would later become Ohio); and New Jersey (1804).) No Southern state adopted similar policies. In 1807, Congress made the importation of slaves a crime, effective January 1, 1808, which was as soon as Article I, section 9 of the Constitution allowed. A small but dedicated group, under leaders such as William Lloyd Garrison and Frederick Douglass, agitated for abolition in the mid-19th century. John Brown became an advocate and militia leader in attempting to end slavery by force of arms. In the Civil War, immediate emancipation became a war goal for the Union in 1863 and was fully achieved in 1865.

== History ==
=== In Colonial America ===
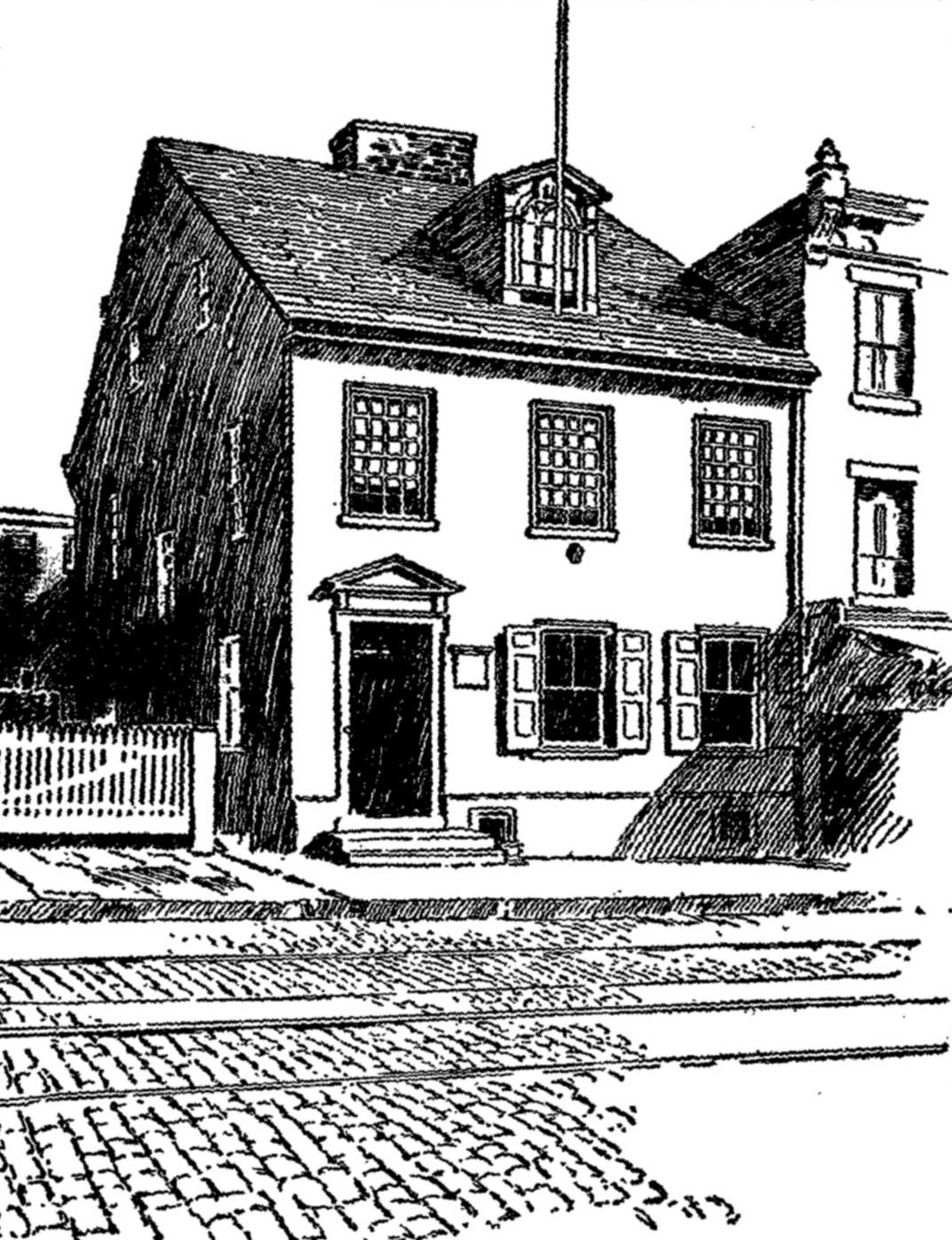
Thones Kunders's house at 5109 Germantown Avenue, where the 1688 Germantown Quaker Petition Against Slavery was written

American abolitionism began well before the United States was founded as a nation. In 1652, Rhode Island made it illegal for any person, black or white, to be "bound" longer than ten years. The law, however, was widely ignored, and Rhode Island became involved in the slave trade in 1700.

An early prominent example of resistance by enslaved people occurred during Bacon's Rebellion in 1676. Occurring in Virginia, the rebellion saw European indentured servants and African people (of indentured, enslaved, and free negroes) band together against William Berkeley because of his refusal to fully remove Native American tribes in the region. At the time, Native Americans in the region were hosting raids against lower-class settlers encroaching on their land after the Third Powhatan War (1644–1646), which left many white and black indentured servants and slaves without a sense of protection from their government. Led by Nathaniel Bacon, the unification that occurred between the white lower class and blacks during this rebellion was perceived as dangerous and thus was quashed with the implementation of the Virginia Slave Codes of 1705. Still, this event introduced the premise that blacks and whites could work together towards the goal of self-liberation, which became increasingly prevalent as abolition gained traction within America.

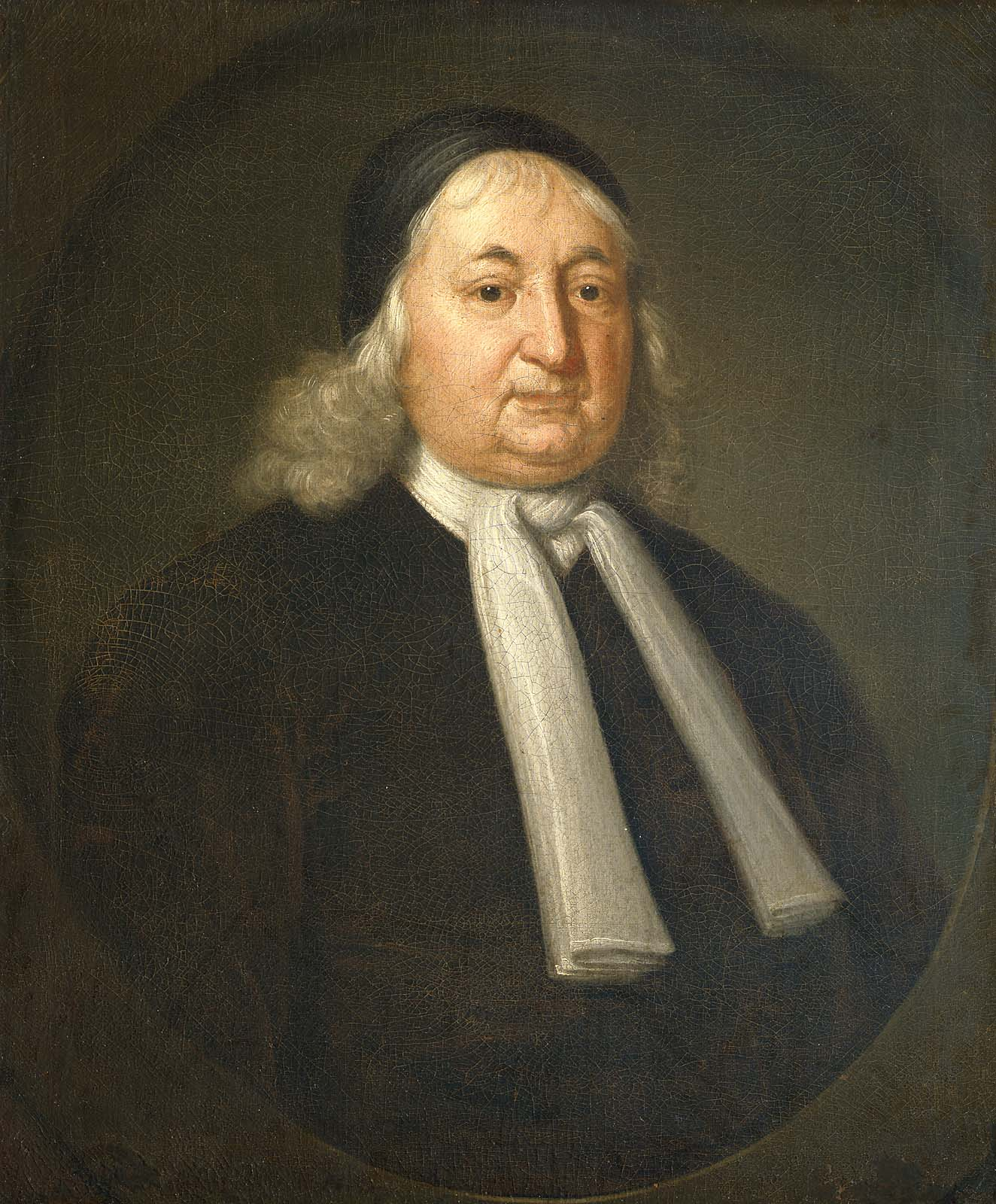
Samuel Sewall (1652–1730), judge who wrote The Selling of Joseph (1700) which denounced the spread of slavery in the American colonies

The first written statement against slavery in Colonial America was prepared in 1688 by members of the Religious Society of Friends. On 18 February 1688, Francis Daniel Pastorius, the brothers Derick and Abraham op den Graeff and Gerrit Hendricksz of Germantown, Pennsylvania, drafted the 1688 Germantown Quaker Petition Against Slavery, a two-page condemnation of slavery, and sent it to the governing bodies of their Quaker meeting. The intention of the petition was to stop slavery within the Quaker community, where 70% of Quakers owned slaves between 1681 and 1705. It acknowledged the universal rights of all people. While the Quaker establishment did not take action at that time, the unusually early, clear, and forceful argument in the petition initiated the spirit that finally led to the end of slavery in the Society of Friends (1776) and in the Commonwealth of Pennsylvania (1780). The Quaker Quarterly Meeting of Chester, Pennsylvania, made its first protest in 1711. Within a few decades the entire slave trade was under attack, being opposed by such Quaker leaders as William Burling, Benjamin Lay, Ralph Sandiford, William Southby, John Woolman, and Anthony Benezet. Benezet was particularly influential, inspiring a later generation of notable anti-slavery activists, including Granville Sharp, John Wesley, Thomas Clarkson, Olaudah Equiano, Benjamin Franklin, Benjamin Rush, Absalom Jones, and Bishop Richard Allen, among others.

Samuel Sewall, a prominent Bostonian, wrote The Selling of Joseph (1700) in protest of the widening practice of outright slavery as opposed to indentured servitude in the colonies. This is the earliest-recorded anti-slavery tract published in the future United States.

Slavery was banned in the colony of Georgia soon after its founding in 1733. The colony's founder, James Edward Oglethorpe, fended off repeated attempts by South Carolina merchants and land speculators to introduce slavery into the colony. His motivations included tactical defense against Spanish collusion with runaway slaves, and prevention of Georgia's largely reformed criminal population from replicating South Carolina's planter class structure. In 1739, he wrote to the Georgia Trustees urging them to hold firm:

If we allow slaves we act against the very principles by which we associated together, which was to relieve the distresses. Whereas, now we should occasion the misery of thousands in Africa, by setting men upon using arts to buy and bring into perpetual slavery the poor people who now live there free.

— James Edward Oglethorpe, 1739

In 1737, Quaker abolitionist Benjamin Lay published All Slave-Keepers That Keep the Innocent in Bondage, Apostates, which was printed by his friend, Benjamin Franklin. The following year, during the 1738 Philadelphia Yearly Meeting in Burlington, New Jersey, Lay made a speech against slavery during which he threw off a cloak to reveal he was dressed as a soldier and wearing a sword (shocking to the pacifist quakers), then plunged the sword into a book containing a hidden bladder of fake blood (pokeberry juice), splattering those nearby in criticism of the violence they were perpetrating by practicing slavery.

On September 9, 1739, a literate slave named Jemmy led a rebellion against South Carolina slaveholders in an event referred to as the Stono Rebellion (also known as Cato's Conspiracy and Cato's Rebellion.) The runaway slaves involved in the revolt intended to reach Spanish-controlled Florida to attain freedom, but their plans were thwarted by white colonists in Charlestown, South Carolina. The event resulted in 25 colonists and 35 to 50 African slaves killed, as well as the implementation of the 1740 Negro Act to prevent another slave uprising. In her book, "The Slave's Cause" by Manisha Sinha, Sinha considers the Stono Rebellion to be an important act of abolition from the perspective of the slave, recognizing their agency and subsequent humanity as cause for self-liberation.

Slave revolts following the Stono Rebellion were a present mode of abolition undertaken by slaves and were an indicator of black agency that brewed beneath the surface of the abolitionist movement for decades and eventually sprouted later on through figures such as Frederick Douglass, an escaped black freeman who was a popular orator and essayist for the abolitionist cause.

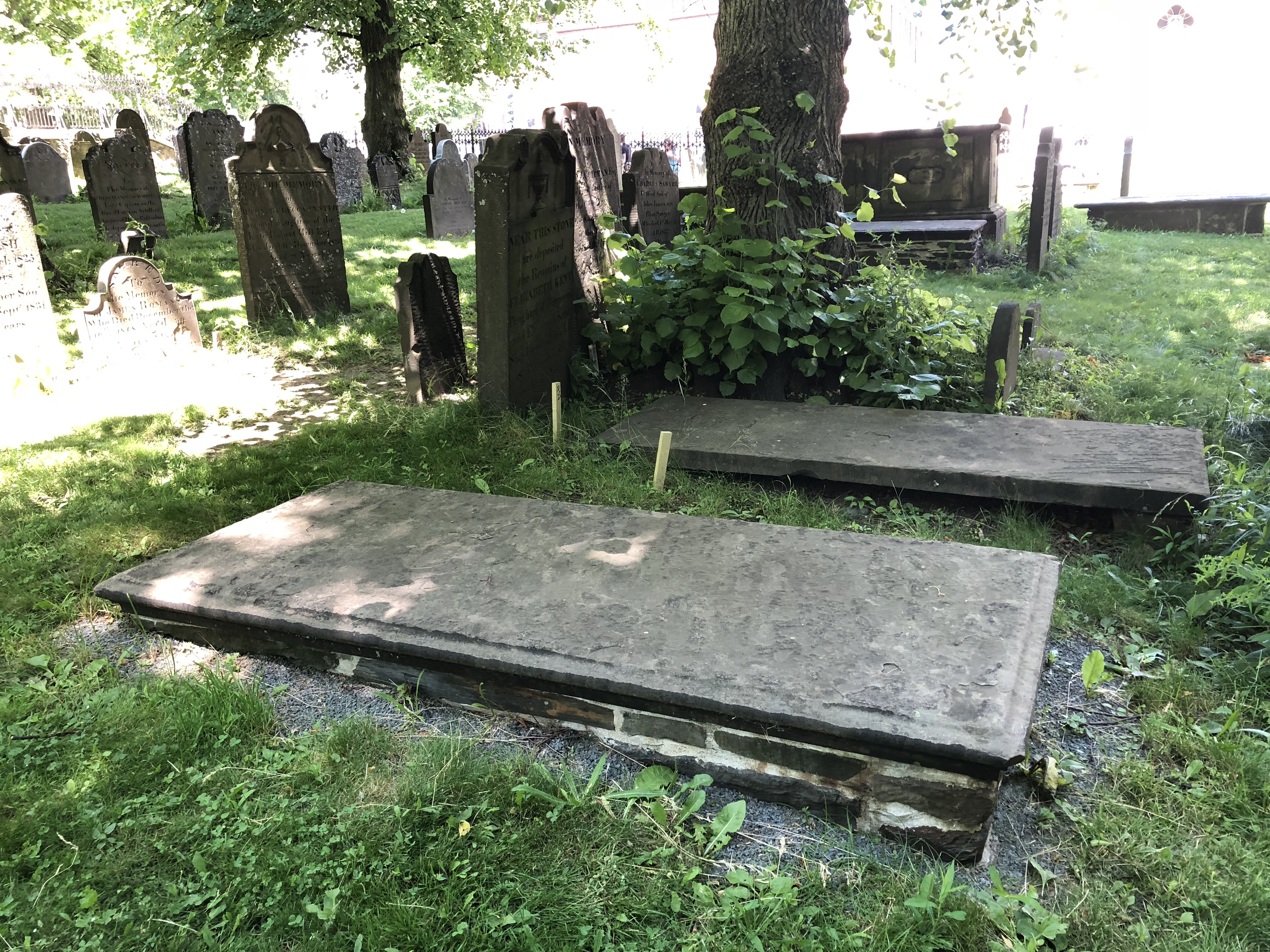
Grave of Benjamin Kent, lawyer who freed a slave in America (1766)

The struggle between Georgia and South Carolina led to the first debates in Parliament over the issue of slavery, occurring between 1740 and 1742.

Rhode Island Quakers, associated with Moses Brown, were among the first in America to free slaves. Benjamin Rush was another leader, as were many Quakers. John Woolman gave up most of his business in 1756 to devote himself to campaigning against slavery along with other Quakers.

Between 1764 and 1774, seventeen enslaved African Americans appeared before the Massachusetts courts in freedom suits, spurred on the decision made in the Somerset v. Stewart case, which although not applying the colonies was still received positively by American abolitionists. Boston lawyer Benjamin Kent represented them. In 1766, Kent won a case (Slew v. Whipple) to liberate Jenny Slew, a mixed-race woman who had been kidnapped in Massachusetts and then handled as a slave.

According to historian Steven Pincus, many of the colonial legislatures worked to enact laws that would limit slavery. The Provincial legislature of Massachusetts Bay, as noted by historian Gary B. Nash, approved a law "prohibiting the importation and purchase of slaves by any Massachusetts citizen." The Loyalist governor of Massachusetts, Thomas Hutchinson, vetoed the law, an action that prompted angered reaction from the general public. American abolitionists were cheered by the decision in Somerset v Stewart (1772), which prohibited slavery in the United Kingdom, though not in its colonies. In 1774, the influential Fairfax Resolves called for an end to the "wicked, cruel and unnatural" Atlantic slave trade.

=== Abolitionism during and after the Revolutionary War ===
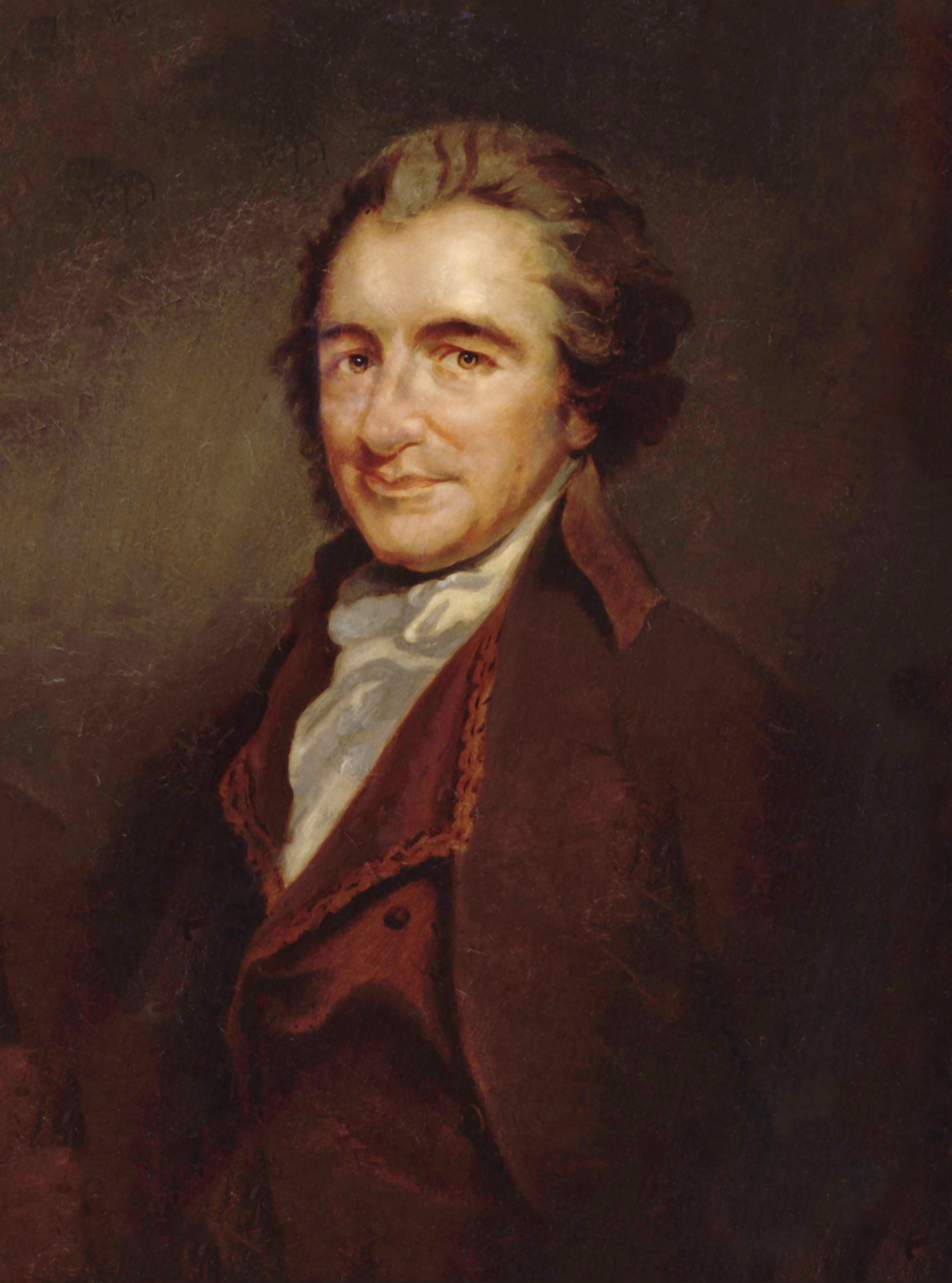
Thomas Paine's 1775 article "African Slavery in America" was one of the first to advocate abolishing slavery and freeing slaves.

One of the first articles advocating the emancipation of slaves and the abolition of slavery was written by Thomas Paine. Titled "African Slavery in America", it appeared on 8 March 1775 in the Postscript to the Pennsylvania Journal and Weekly Advertiser.

The Society for the Relief of Free Negroes Unlawfully Held in Bondage (Pennsylvania Abolition Society) was the first American abolition society, formed 14 April 1775, in Philadelphia, primarily by Quakers. The society suspended operations during the American Revolutionary War and was reorganized in 1784, with Benjamin Franklin as its first president.

In 1777, the Vermont Republic became the first independent state in North America to prohibit slavery: slaves were not directly freed, but masters were required to remove slaves from Vermont.

The Constitution included several provisions which accommodated slavery, although none used the word. Passed unanimously by the Congress of the Confederation in 1787, the Northwest Ordinance forbade slavery in the Northwest Territory, a vast area (the future Ohio, Indiana, Illinois, Michigan, and Wisconsin) in which slavery had been legal, but population was sparse.

An animation showing when states and territories forbade or admitted slavery 1789–1861

The first state to begin a gradual abolition of slavery was Pennsylvania, in 1780. All importation of slaves was prohibited, but none were freed at first, only the slaves of masters who failed to register them with the state, along with the "future children" of enslaved mothers. Those enslaved in Pennsylvania before the 1780 law went into effect were not freed until 1847.

Massachusetts took a much more radical position. In 1780, during the Revolution, Massachusetts ratified its constitution and included within it a clause that declared all men equal. Based upon this clause, several freedom suits were filed by enslaved African Americans living in Massachusetts. In 1783, its Supreme Court, in the case of Commonwealth v. Nathaniel Jennison, reaffirmed the case of Brom and Bett v. Ashley, which held that even slaves were people who had a constitutional right to liberty. This gave freedom to slaves, effectively abolishing slavery.

States with a greater economic interest in slaves, such as New York and New Jersey, passed gradual emancipation laws. While some of these laws were gradual, these states enacted the first abolition laws in the entire "New World". In the State of New York, the enslaved population was transformed into indentured servants before being granted full emancipation in 1827. In other states, abolitionist legislation provided freedom only for the children of the enslaved. In New Jersey, slavery was not fully prohibited until the passage of the Thirteenth Amendment.

Abolition of slavery in the various states of the US over time: Abolition of slavery during or shortly after the American Revolution (Vermont, 1777; Massachusetts [including Maine], 1783) The Northwest Ordinance, 1787 Gradual emancipation in New York (starting 1799, ended 1827), Pennsylvania (1780–1857), New Hampshire (1783–1857), Connecticut [including the Western Reserve] (1784–1848), Rhode Island (1784–1853) and New Jersey (starting 1804; ended by Thirteenth Amendment, 1865) The Missouri Compromise, 1821 Effective abolition of slavery by Mexican or joint US/British authority Abolition of slavery by Congressional action, 1861 Abolition of slavery by Congressional action, 1862 Emancipation Proclamation as originally issued, 1 Jan 1863 Subsequent operation of the Emancipation Proclamation in 1863 Abolition of slavery by state action during the Civil War Operation of the Emancipation Proclamation in 1864 Operation of the Emancipation Proclamation in 1865 Thirteenth Amendment to the US constitution, 18 Dec 1865 Territory incorporated into the US after the passage of the Thirteenth Amendment

All of the other states north of Maryland began gradual abolition of slavery between 1781 and 1804, based on the Pennsylvania model and by 1804, all the Northern states had passed laws to gradually or immediately abolish it. (Note: The Northern states adopted anti-slavery policies or court decisions as follows: Vermont (1777, before it had become a U.S. state); Pennsylvania (1780); Massachusetts (1783); New Hampshire (1783); Connecticut (1784); Rhode Island (1784); New York (1799); Ohio (1802) (although the Northwest Ordinance of 1787 had already banned slavery in the lands that would later become Ohio); and New Jersey (1804).) Some slaves continued in involuntary, unpaid "indentured servitude" for two more decades, and others were moved south and sold to new owners in slave states.

Some individual slaveholders, particularly in the upper South, freed slaves, sometimes in their wills. Many noted they had been moved by the revolutionary ideals of the equality of men. The number of free blacks as a proportion of the black population in the upper South increased from less than 1 percent to nearly 10 percent between 1790 and 1810 as a result of these actions. Some slave owners, concerned about the increase in free blacks, which they viewed as destabilizing, freed slaves on condition that they emigrate to Africa.

All U.S. states abolished the transatlantic slave trade by 1798. South Carolina, which had abolished the slave trade in 1787, reversed that decision in 1803. In the American South, freedom suits were rejected by the courts, which held that the rights in the state constitutions did not apply to African Americans.

=== The South after 1804 ===
The institution of slavery remained solid in the South, and that region's customs and social beliefs evolved into a strident defense of slavery in response to the rise of a growing anti-slavery stance in the North. In 1835 alone, abolitionists mailed over a million pieces of anti-slavery literature to the South, giving rise to the gag rules in Congress, after the theft of mail from the Charleston, South Carolina, post office, and much back-and-forth about whether postmasters were required to deliver this mail. According to the Postmaster General, they were not.

Under the Constitution, the importation of enslaved persons could not be prohibited until 1808 (20 years). As the end of the 20 years approached, an Act Prohibiting Importation of Slaves sailed through Congress with little opposition. President Jefferson signed it, and it went effect on January 1, 1808.

In 1820, the Act to Protect the Commerce of the United States and Punish the Crime of Piracy was passed. This law made importing slaves into the United States a death penalty offense.

=== Abolitionism's re-emergence ===
In 1830, most Americans were, at least in principle, opposed to slavery. However, opponents of slavery deliberated on how to end the institution, as well as what would become of the slaves once they were free. As put in The Philanthropist:

If the chain of slavery can be broken, ... we may cherish the hope ... that proper means will be devised for the disposal of the blacks, and that this foul and unnatural crime of holding men in bondage will finally be rooted out from our land.

In the 1830s there was a progressive shift in thinking in the North. Mainstream opinion changed from gradual emancipation and resettlement of freed blacks in Africa, sometimes a condition of their manumission, to immediatism: freeing all the slaves immediately and sorting out the problems later. This change was in many cases sudden, a consequence of the individual's coming in direct contact with the horrors of American slavery, or hearing of them from a credible source. As it was put by Amos Adams Lawrence, who witnessed the capture and return to slavery of Anthony Burns, "we went to bed one night old-fashioned, conservative, Compromise Union Whigs and waked up stark mad Abolitionists."

==== Garrison and immediate emancipation ====
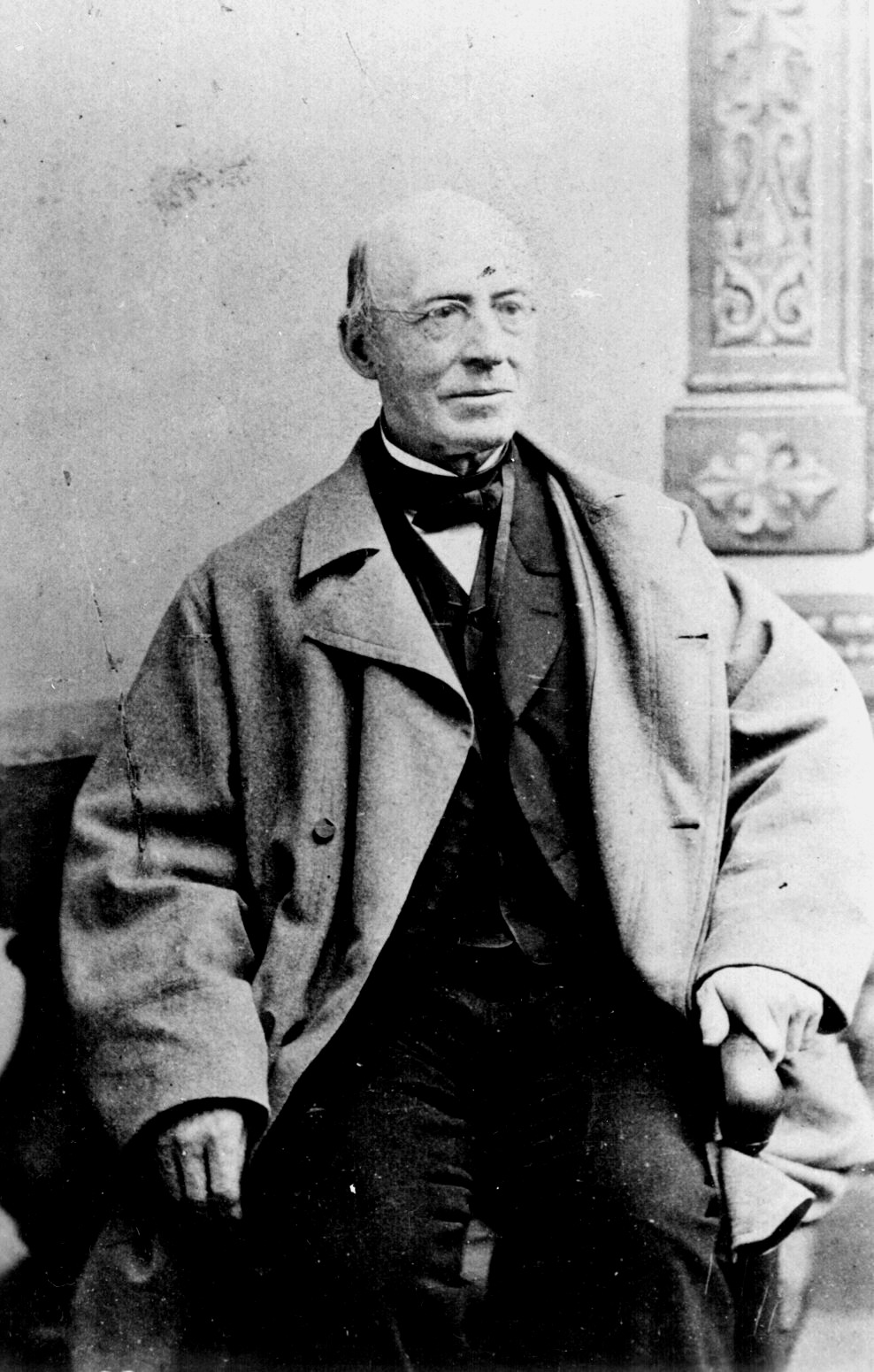
Wm. Lloyd Garrison (1805–1879), publisher of the abolitionist newspaper The Liberator and one of the founders of the American Anti-Slavery Society

The American beginning of abolitionism as a political movement is usually dated from 1 January 1831, when Wm. Lloyd Garrison (as he always signed himself) published the first issue of his new weekly newspaper, The Liberator (1831), which appeared without interruption until slavery in the United States was abolished in 1865, when it closed.

===== Immediate abolition =====
Abolitionists included those who joined the American Anti-Slavery Society or its auxiliary groups in the 1830s and 1840s, as the movement fragmented. The fragmented anti-slavery movement included groups such as the Liberty Party; the American and Foreign Anti-Slavery Society; the American Missionary Association; and the Church Anti-Slavery Society. Historians traditionally distinguish between moderate anti-slavery reformers or gradualists, who concentrated on stopping the spread of slavery, and radical abolitionists or immediatists, whose demands for unconditional emancipation often merged with a concern for Black civil rights. However, James Stewart advocates a more nuanced understanding of the relationship of abolition and anti-slavery prior to the Civil War:

While instructive, the distinction [between anti-slavery and abolition] can also be misleading, especially in assessing abolitionism's political impact. For one thing, slaveholders never bothered with such fine points. Many immediate abolitionists showed no less concern than did other white Northerners about the fate of the nation's "precious legacies of freedom". Immediatism became most difficult to distinguish from broader anti-Southern opinions once ordinary citizens began articulating these intertwining beliefs.

Nearly all Northern politicians, such as Abraham Lincoln, rejected the "immediate emancipation" called for by the abolitionists, seeing it as "extreme". Indeed, many Northern leaders, including Lincoln, Stephen Douglas (the Democratic nominee in 1860), John C. Frémont (the Republican nominee in 1856), and Ulysses S. Grant married into slave-owning Southern families without any moral qualms.

Anti-slavery as a principle was far more than just the wish to prevent the expansion of slavery. After 1840, abolitionists rejected this because it let sin continue to exist; they demanded that slavery end everywhere, immediately and completely. John Brown was the only abolitionist to have actually planned a violent insurrection, though David Walker promoted the idea. The abolitionist movement was strengthened by the activities of free African Americans, especially in the Black church, who argued that the old Biblical justifications for slavery contradicted the New Testament.

African-American activists and their writings were rarely heard outside the Black community. However, they were tremendously influential on a few sympathetic white people, most prominently the first white activist to reach prominence, Wm. Lloyd Garrison, who was its most effective propagandist. Garrison's efforts to recruit eloquent spokesmen led to the discovery of ex-slave Frederick Douglass, who eventually became a prominent activist in his own right. Eventually, Douglass would publish his own widely distributed abolitionist newspaper, North Star.

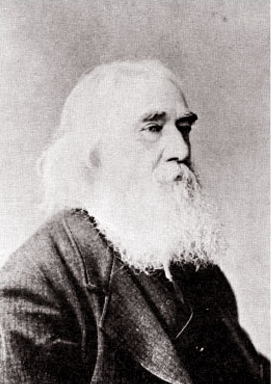
Lysander Spooner (1808–1887), an individualist anarchist who wrote The Unconstitutionality of Slavery (1845)

In the early 1850s, the American abolitionist movement split into two camps over the question of whether the United States Constitution did or did not protect slavery. This issue arose in the late 1840s after the publication of The Unconstitutionality of Slavery by Lysander Spooner. The Garrisonians, led by Garrison and Wendell Phillips, publicly burned copies of the Constitution, called it a pact with slavery, and demanded its abolition and replacement. Another camp, led by Lysander Spooner, Gerrit Smith, and eventually Douglass, considered the Constitution to be an anti-slavery document. Using an argument based upon Natural Law and a form of social contract theory, they said that slavery fell outside the Constitution's scope of legitimate authority and therefore should be abolished.

Another split in the abolitionist movement was along class lines. The artisan republicanism of Robert Dale Owen and Frances Wright stood in stark contrast to the politics of prominent elite abolitionists such as industrialist Arthur Tappan and his evangelist brother Lewis. While the former pair opposed slavery on a basis of solidarity of "wage slaves" with "chattel slaves", the Whiggish Tappans strongly rejected this view, opposing the characterization of Northern workers as "slaves" in any sense. (Lott, 129–130)

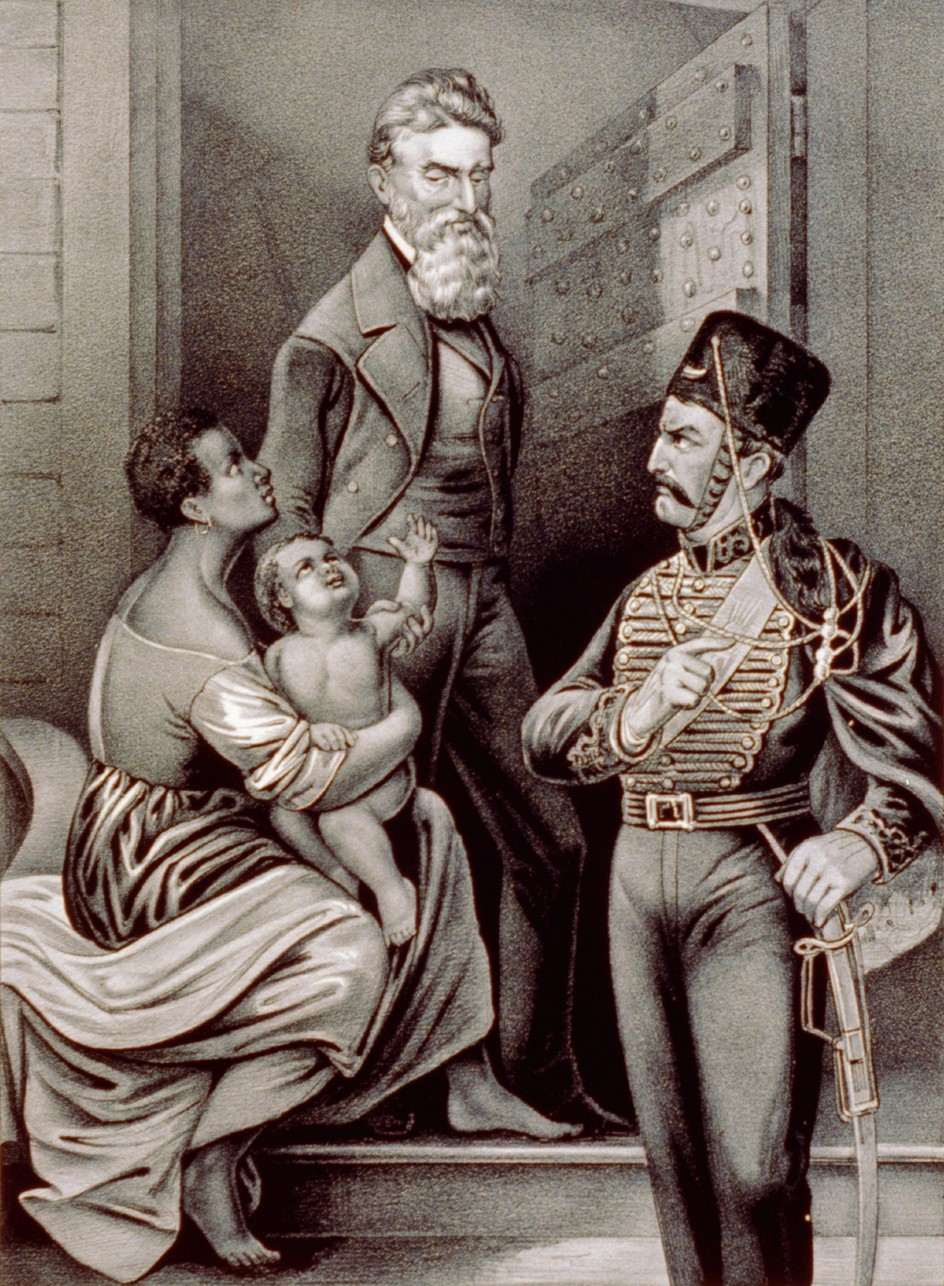
Idealized portrait of John Brown being adored by an enslaved mother and child as he walks to his execution

Many American abolitionists took an active role in opposing slavery by supporting the Underground Railroad. This was made illegal by the federal Fugitive Slave Law of 1850, arguably the most hated and most openly evaded federal legislation in the nation's history. Nevertheless, participants like Harriet Tubman, Henry Highland Garnet, Alexander Crummell, Amos Noë Freeman, and others continued with their work. Abolitionists were particularly active in Ohio, where some worked directly in the Underground Railroad. Since only the Ohio River separated free Ohio from slave Kentucky, it was a popular destination for fugitive slaves. Supporters helped them there, in many cases to cross Lake Erie by boat, into Canada. The Western Reserve area of northeast Ohio was "probably the most intensely antislavery section of the country." The Oberlin-Wellington Rescue got national publicity. Abolitionist John Brown grew up in Hudson, Ohio. In the South, members of the abolitionist movement or other people opposing slavery were often targets of lynch mob violence before the American Civil War.

Numerous known abolitionists lived, worked, and worshipped in downtown Brooklyn, from Henry Ward Beecher, who auctioned slaves into freedom from the pulpit of Plymouth Church, to Nathaniel Eggleston, a leader of the American and Foreign Anti-Slavery Society, who also preached at the Bridge Street African Methodist Episcopal Church, and lived on Duffield Street. His fellow Duffield Street residents Thomas and Harriet Truesdell were leading members of the abolitionist movement. Mr. Truesdell was a founding member of the Providence Anti-slavery Society before moving to Brooklyn in 1838. Harriet Truesdell was also very active in the movement, organizing an anti-slavery convention in Pennsylvania Hall (Philadelphia). Another prominent Brooklyn-based abolitionist was Rev. Joshua Leavitt, trained as a lawyer at Yale, who stopped practicing law in order to attend Yale Divinity School, and subsequently edited the abolitionist newspaper The Emancipator and campaigned against slavery, as well as advocating other social reforms. In 1841, Leavitt published The Financial Power of Slavery, which argued that the South was draining the national economy due to its reliance on enslaved workers. In 2007, Duffield Street was given the name Abolitionist Place, and the Truesdells' home at 227 Duffield received landmark status in 2021.

=== Summary of progress ===
The federal government prohibited the transatlantic slave trade in 1808, prohibited the slave trade in the District of Columbia in 1850, outlawed slavery in the District of Columbia in 1862, and, with the Thirteenth Amendment to the United States Constitution, made slavery unconstitutional altogether, except as punishment for a crime, in 1865. This was a direct result of the Union victory in the American Civil War. The central issue of the war was slavery.

Charles Turner Torrey, c. 1840, from Memoir of Rev. Charles T. Torrey, Joseph P. Lovejoy, ed. (Boston: John P. Jewett & Co.), 1847

In the North, most opponents of slavery supported other modernizing reform movements such as the temperance movement, public schooling, and prison- and asylum-building. They were split on the issue of women's activism and their political role, and this contributed to a major rift in the Society. In 1839, brothers Arthur Tappan and Lewis Tappan left the Society and formed the American and Foreign Anti-Slavery Society, which did not admit women. Other members of the Society, including Charles Turner Torrey, Amos Phelps, Henry Stanton, and Alanson St. Clair, in addition to disagreeing with Garrison on the women's issue, urged taking a much more activist approach to abolitionism and consequently challenged Garrison's leadership at the Society's annual meeting in January 1839. When the challenge was beaten back, they left and founded the New Organization, which adopted a more activist approach to freeing slaves. Soon after, in 1840, they formed the Liberty Party, which had as its sole platform the abolition of slavery. By the end of 1840, Garrison himself announced the formation of a third new organization, the Friends of Universal Reform, with sponsors and founding members including prominent reformers Maria Chapman, Abby Kelley Foster, Oliver Johnson, and Bronson Alcott (father of Louisa May Alcott).

Abolitionists such as William Lloyd Garrison repeatedly condemned slavery for contradicting the principles of freedom and equality on which the country was founded. In 1854, Garrison wrote:

I am a believer in that portion of the Declaration of American Independence in which it is set forth, as among self-evident truths, "that all men are created equal; that they are endowed by their Creator with certain inalienable rights; that among these are life, liberty, and the pursuit of happiness." Hence, I am an abolitionist. Hence, I cannot but regard oppression in every form – and most of all, that which turns a man into a thing – with indignation and abhorrence. Not to cherish these feelings would be recreancy to principle. They who desire me to be dumb on the subject of slavery, unless I will open my mouth in its defense, ask me to give the lie to my professions, to degrade my manhood, and to stain my soul. I will not be a liar, a poltroon, or a hypocrite, to accommodate any party, to gratify any sect, to escape any odium or peril, to save any interest, to preserve any institution, or to promote any object. Convince me that one man may rightfully make another man his slave, and I will no longer subscribe to the Declaration of Independence. Convince me that liberty is not the inalienable birthright of every human being, of whatever complexion or clime, and I will give that instrument to the consuming fire. I do not know how to espouse freedom and slavery together.

=== Uncle Tom's Cabin and The Impending Crisis of the South ===
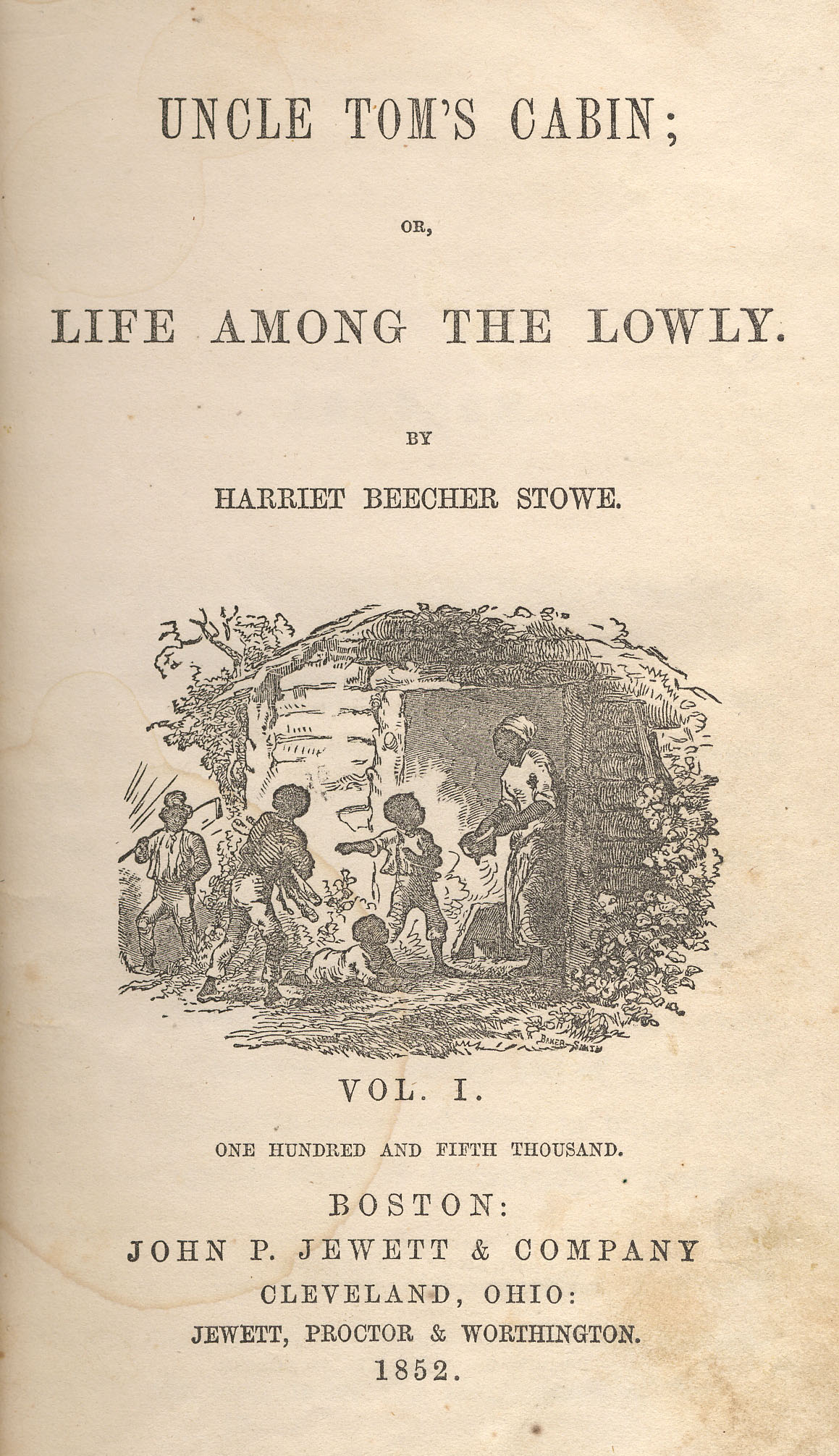
Uncle Tom's Cabin inflamed public opinion in the North and Europe against the personified evils of slavery

The most influential abolitionist publication was Uncle Tom's Cabin (1852), the best-selling novel by Harriet Beecher Stowe, who had attended the anti-slavery debates at Lane, of which her father, Lyman Beecher, was the president. Outraged by the Fugitive Slave Law of 1850 (which made the escape narrative part of everyday news), Stowe emphasized the horrors that abolitionists had long claimed about slavery. Her depiction of the evil slave owner Simon Legree, a transplanted Yankee who kills the Christ-like Uncle Tom, outraged the North, helped sway British public opinion against the South, and inflamed Southern slave owners who tried to refute it by showing that some slave owners were humanitarian. Although incredibly influential to the abolitionist struggle, it also proved the largely white preference that abolition still carried during this time period, as a white woman's retelling of American slavery became more influential during this time than several black abolitionist newspaper's depictions of slavery. It inspired numerous anti-Tom, pro-slavery novels, several written and published by women.

According to a book reviewer, "Next to Uncle Tom's Cabin (1852), Hinton Helper's critique of slavery and the Southern class system, The Impending Crisis of the South (1857), was arguably the most important antislavery book of the 1850s." According to historian George M. Fredrickson, "it would not be difficult to make a case for The Impending Crisis as the most important single book, in terms of its political impact, that has ever been published in the United States." Helper was a Southerner and a virulent racist, but he was nevertheless an abolitionist, because, as he argued in The Impending Crisis of the South, slavery hurt the economic prospects of non-slaveholders and was an impediment to the growth of the entire region of the South.

== The Constitution and ending slavery ==
=== The Republican strategy of using the Constitution ===
Two diametrically opposed anti-slavery positions emerged regarding the United States Constitution. The Garrisonians emphasized that the document permitted and protected slavery and was therefore "an agreement with hell" that had to be rejected in favor of immediate emancipation. The mainstream anti-slavery position adopted by the new Republican party argued that the Constitution could and should be used to eventually end slavery. They assumed that the Constitution gave the government no authority to abolish slavery directly. However, there were multiple tactics available to support the long-term strategy of using the Constitution as a battering ram against the peculiar institution. First Congress could block the admission of any new slave states. That would steadily move the balance of power in Congress and the Electoral College in favor of freedom. Congress could abolish slavery in the District of Columbia and the territories. Congress could use the Commerce Clause to end the interstate slave trade, thereby crippling the steady movement of slavery from the southeast to the southwest. Congress could recognize free blacks as full citizens and insist on due process rights to protect fugitive slaves from being captured and returned to bondage. Finally, the government could use patronage powers to promote the anti-slavery cause across the country, especially in the border states. Pro-slavery elements considered the Republican strategy to be much more dangerous to their cause than radical abolitionism. Lincoln's election was met by secession. Indeed, the Republican strategy mapped the "crooked path to abolition" that prevailed during the Civil War.

=== Events leading to emancipation ===
In the 1850s, the slave trade remained legal in all 16 states of the American South. While slavery was fading away in the cities and border states, it remained strong in plantation areas that grew cash crops such as cotton, sugar, rice, tobacco or hemp. By the 1860 United States census, the slave population in the United States had grown to four million. American abolitionism, after Nat Turner's revolt ended its discussion in the South, was based in the North, and white Southerners alleged it fostered slave rebellion.

The white abolitionist movement in the North was led by social reformers, especially William Lloyd Garrison, founder of the American Anti-Slavery Society, and writers such as John Greenleaf Whittier and Harriet Beecher Stowe. Black activists included former slaves such as Frederick Douglass, and free blacks such as the brothers Charles Henry Langston and John Mercer Langston, who helped to found the Ohio Anti-Slavery Society. (Note: The American Anti-Slavery Society offered twelve of the Lane Rebels "commissions and employment". "On our way to our lecturing field, we stopped at Putnam and assisted [in April of 1835] in the formation of the Ohio Anti-Slavery Society." [W]e gathered at Cleveland, where, by the grace of Judge Sterling, his law office was made free to us for the purpose, and there was opened a school of abolition, where, copying documents, with hints, discussions and suggestions, we spent two weeks in earnest and most profitable drill. A chemical question arose, which related to tar and feathers and how to erase their stain. This practical question was disposed of in a single lesson. The names of those availing themselves of this course were: T. D. Weld, S[ereno] W. Streeter, Edward Weld, H. B. Stanton, H[untington] Lyman, James A. Thome, J[ohn] W. Alvord, M[arcus] R. Robinson, George Whipple and W. T. Allan. The American Anti-Slavery Society soon had up to 70 agents.)

Some abolitionists said that slavery was criminal and a sin; they also criticized slave owners for using black women as concubines and taking sexual advantage of them.

==== Compromise of 1850 ====
The Compromise of 1850 attempted to resolve issues surrounding slavery caused by the War with Mexico and the admission to the Union of the slave Republic of Texas. The Compromise of 1850 was proposed by "The Great Compromiser" Henry Clay; support was coordinated by Senator Stephen A. Douglas. Through the compromise, California was admitted as a free state after its state convention unanimously opposed slavery there, Texas was financially compensated for the loss of its territories northwest of the modern state borders, and the slave trade (not slavery) was abolished in the District of Columbia. The Fugitive Slave Law was a concession to the South. Abolitionists were outraged, because the new law required Northerners to help in the capture and return of runaway slaves.

==== Republican Party ====
In 1854, Congress passed the Kansas–Nebraska Act, which opened those territories to slavery if the local residents voted that way. The anti-slavery gains made in previous compromises were reversed. A firestorm of outrage brought together former Whigs, Know-Nothings, and former Free Soil Democrats to form a new party in 1854–56, the Republican Party. It included a program of rapid modernization involving the government promotion of industry, railroads, banks, free homesteads, and colleges, all to the annoyance of the South. The new party denounced the Slave Power – that is the political power of the slave owners who supposedly controlled the national government for their own benefit and to the disadvantage of the ordinary white man.

The Republicans wanted to achieve the gradual extinction of slavery by market forces, because its members believed that free labor was superior to slave labor. Southern leaders said the Republican policy of blocking the expansion of slavery into the West made them second-class citizens, and challenged their autonomy. With the 1860 presidential victory of Abraham Lincoln, seven Deep South states whose economy was based on cotton and slavery decided to secede and form a new nation. The American Civil War broke out in April 1861 with the firing on Fort Sumter in South Carolina. When Lincoln called for troops to suppress the rebellion, four more slave states seceded.

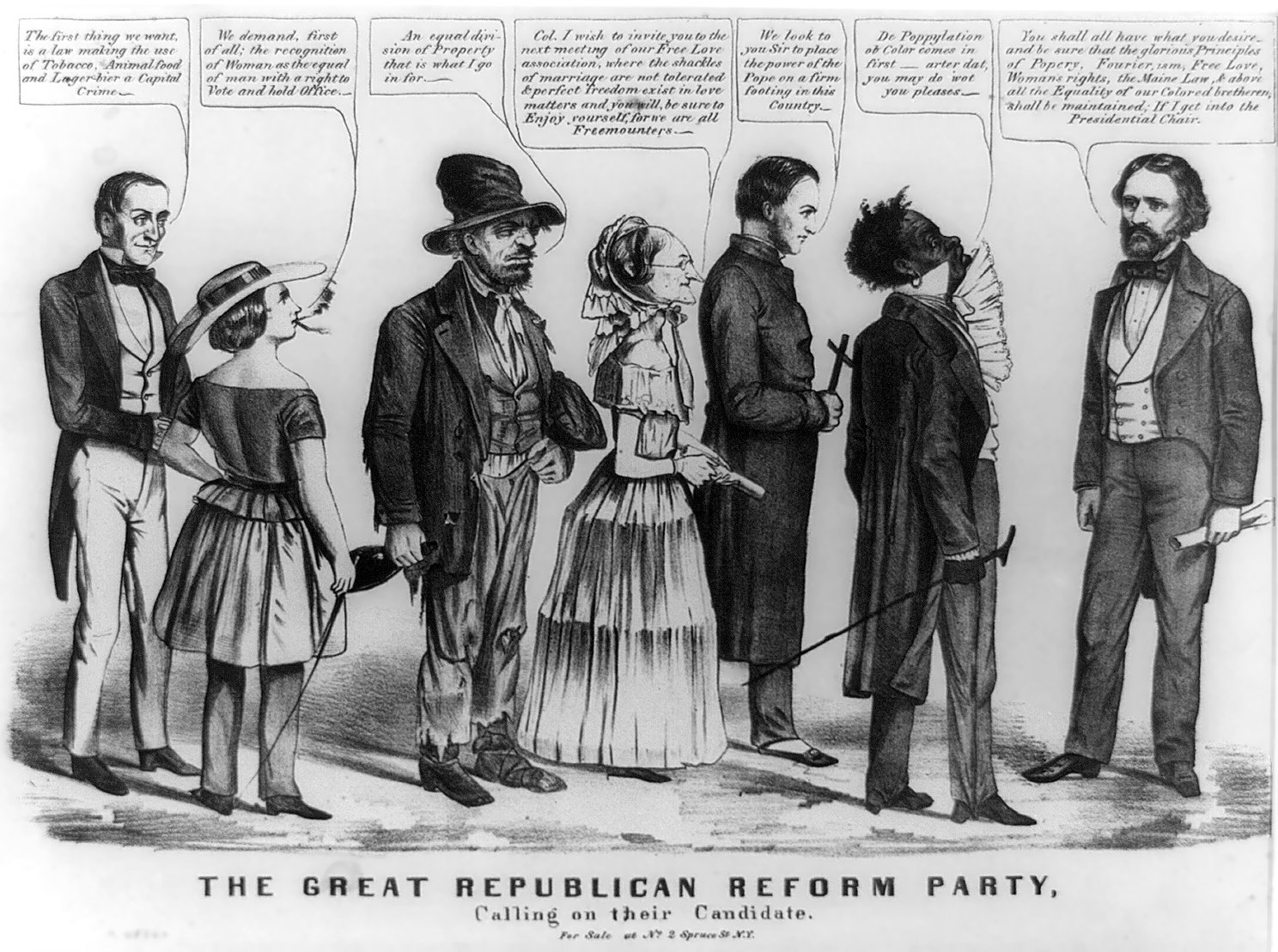
This Democratic editorial cartoon links Republican candidate John Frémont (far right) to temperance, feminism, Fourierism, free love, Catholicism, and abolition.

The crisis in Kansas Territory and the neighboring slave state of Missouri turned bloody during what was known as the Bleeding Kansas crisis of the 1850s. Proslavery border ruffians and Bushwhackers fought antislavery "free-staters" and Jayhawkers. Paramilitary guerrilla warfare became widespread in the area, as a prelude to the Civil War. The violence would spread to many other places, including the Senate Chamber of the U.S. Capitol where a Southern Democrat attacked a Northern Republican with a cane as his political allies watched.

Explorer, army veteran, and abolitionist John C. Frémont ran as the first Republican nominee for president in 1856. The new party crusaded on the slogan: "Free soil, free silver, free men, Frémont and victory!" Although he lost, the party showed a strong base. It dominated in Yankee areas of New England, New York and the northern Midwest, and had a strong presence in the rest of the North. It had almost no support in the South, where it was roundly denounced in 1856–60 as a divisive force that threatened civil war. The newly-formed Republican Party gained quite a standing in the 1856 to 1857 election cycle in the U.S. House and Senate, cementing its status as the primary party for abolitionists and northerners for some time.

Without using the term "containment", the new Party in the mid-1850s proposed a system of containing slavery once it gained control of the national government. Historian James Oakes explains the strategy:

The federal government would surround the south with free states, free territories, and free waters, building what they called a "cordon of freedom" around slavery, hemming it in until the system's own internal weaknesses forced the slave states one by one to abandon slavery.

Militant abolitionists demanded immediate emancipation, not a slow-acting containment. Some rejected the new party, and in turn its leaders reassured voters they were not trying to abolish slavery in the U.S. altogether, which was politically impossible, and were just working against its spread.

==== John Brown's raid on Harpers Ferry ====
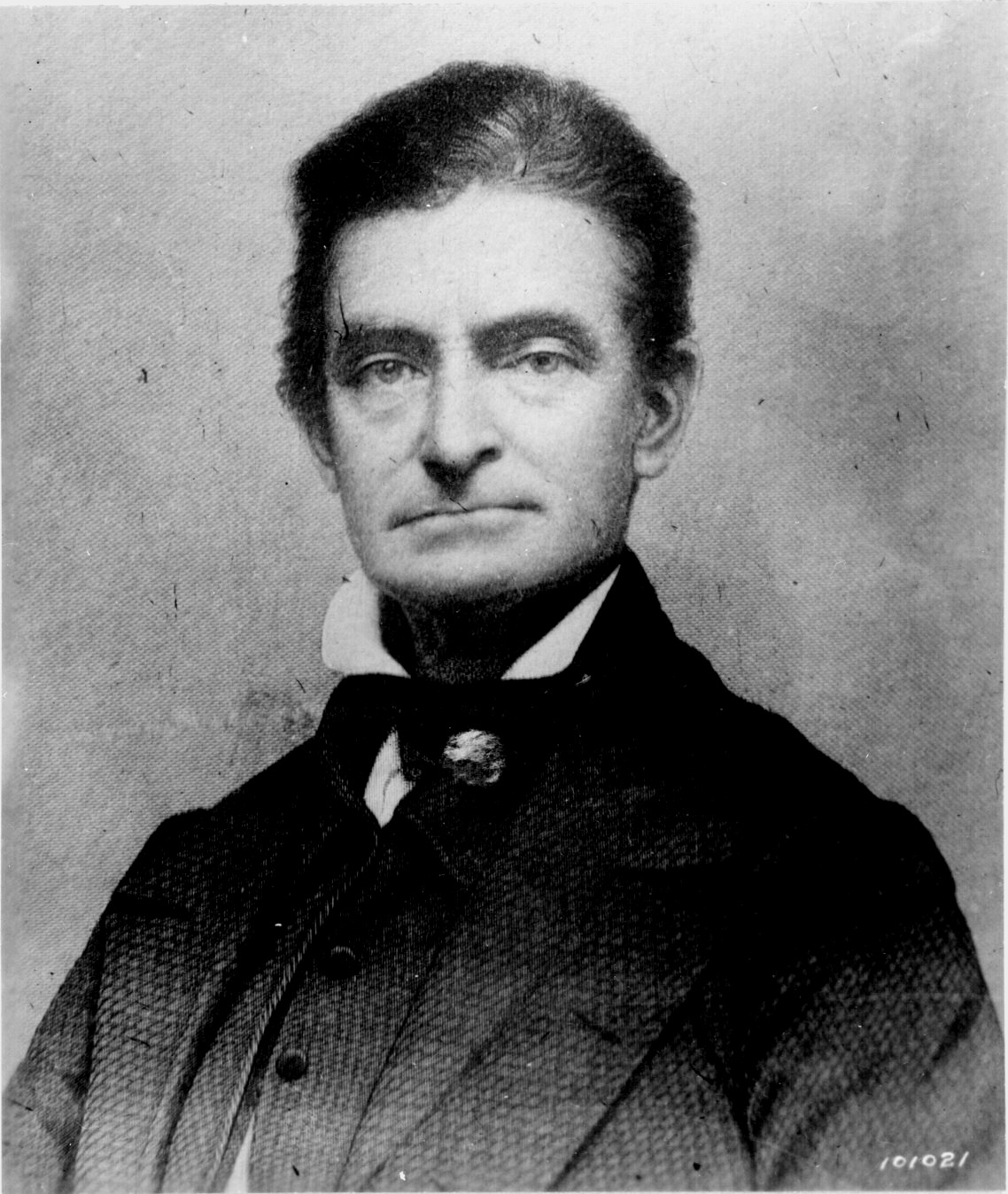
John Brown (1800–1859), abolitionist who advocated armed rebellion by slaves. He slaughtered pro-slavery settlers in Kansas and in 1859 was hanged by the state of Virginia for leading an unsuccessful slave insurrection at Harpers Ferry.

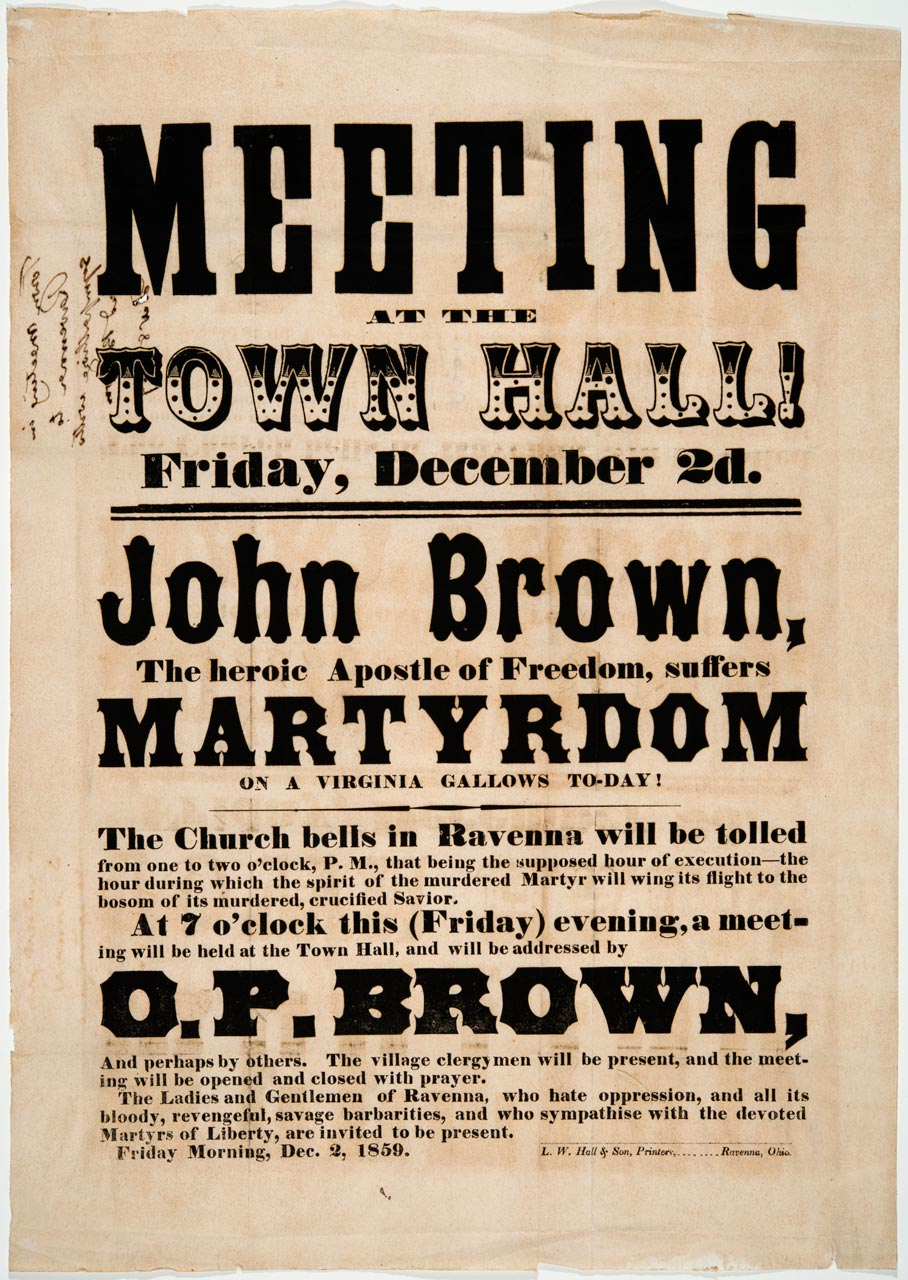
Bells rung in Ravenna, Ohio, at the hour of John Brown's execution.

John Brown has been called "the most controversial of all 19th-century Americans". When Brown was hanged after his attempt to start a slave rebellion in 1859, church bells rang across the North, there was a 100-gun salute in Albany, New York, large memorial meetings took place throughout the North, and famous writers such as Ralph Waldo Emerson and Henry David Thoreau joined other Northerners in praising Brown. Whereas Garrison was a pacifist, Brown believed violence was unfortunately necessary to end slavery.

The raid, though unsuccessful in the short term, may have helped Lincoln get elected and moved the Southern states to secede, leading to the Civil War. Some historians regard Brown as a crazed lunatic, while David S. Reynolds hails him as the man who "killed slavery, sparked the civil war, and seeded civil rights".

His raid in October 1859 involved a band of 22 men who seized the Federal armory at Harper's Ferry, Virginia (since 1863, West Virginia), knowing it contained tens of thousands of weapons. Brown believed the South was on the verge of a gigantic slave uprising and that one spark would set it off. Brown's supporters George Luther Stearns, Franklin B. Sanborn, Thomas Wentworth Higginson, Theodore Parker, Samuel Gridley Howe, and Gerrit Smith were all abolitionists, members of the so-called Secret Six who provided financial backing for Brown's raid. Brown's raid, says historian David Potter, "was meant to be of vast magnitude and to produce a revolutionary slave uprising throughout the South".

The raid did not go as expected. Brown hoped to have quickly a small army of runaway slaves, but made no provision to inform these potential runaways, although he got a little local support. Lt. Colonel Robert E. Lee of the U.S. Army was dispatched to put down the raid, and Brown was quickly captured. He was tried for treason against the Commonwealth of Virginia, murder, and inciting a slave revolt, was found guilty of all charges, and was hanged. At his trial, Brown exuded a remarkable zeal and single-mindedness that played directly to Southerners' worst fears. Under Virginia law there was a month between the sentencing and the hanging, and in those weeks Brown spoke gladly with reporters and anyone else who wanted to see him, and wrote many letters. Few individuals did more to cause secession than John Brown, because Southerners believed he was right about an impending slave revolt. The day of his execution, Brown prophesied, "the crimes of this guilty land will never be purged away but with blood. I had as I now think vainly flattered myself that without very much bloodshed it might be done."

==== American Civil War ====
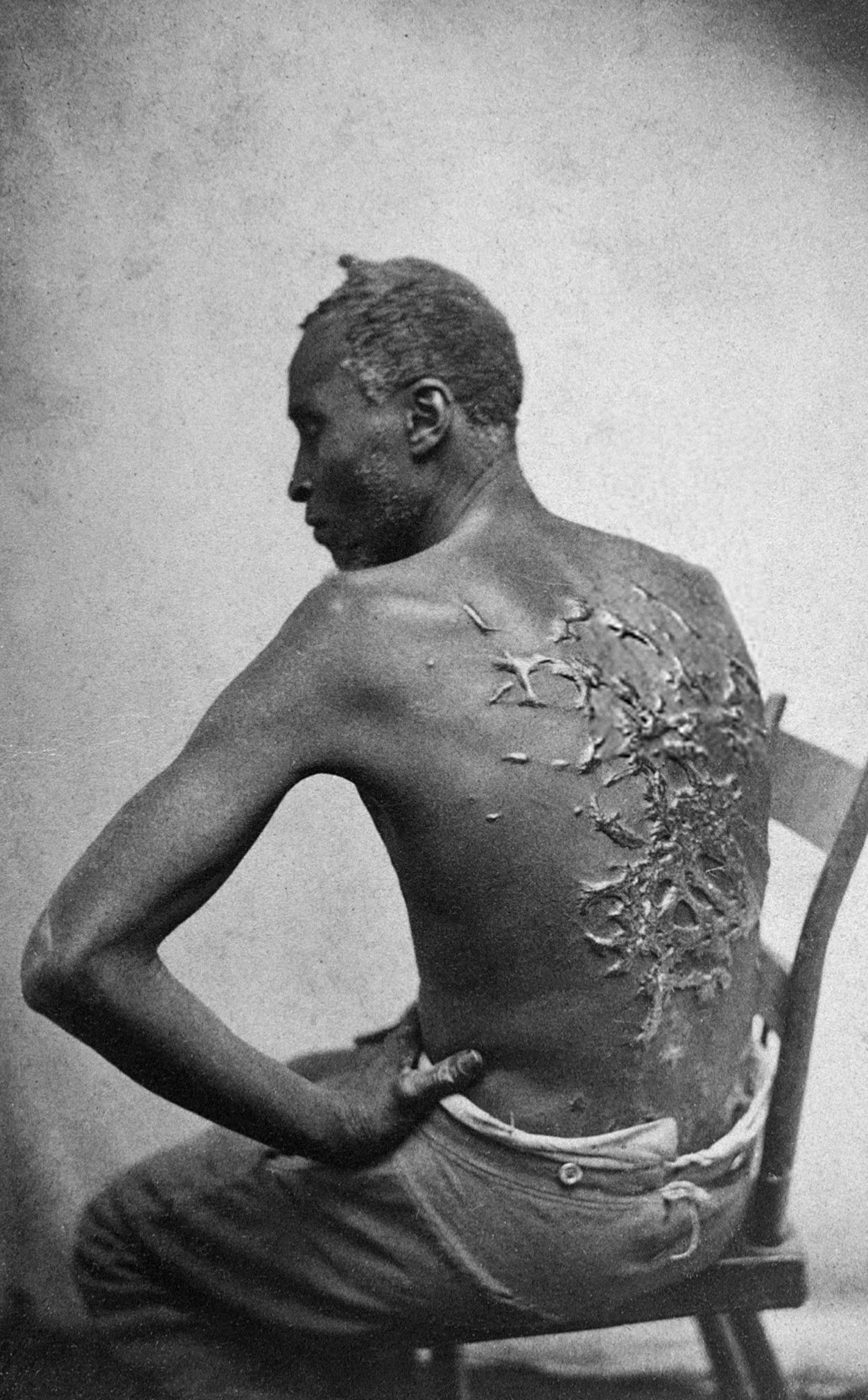
This photo of Gordon was widely distributed by abolitionists.

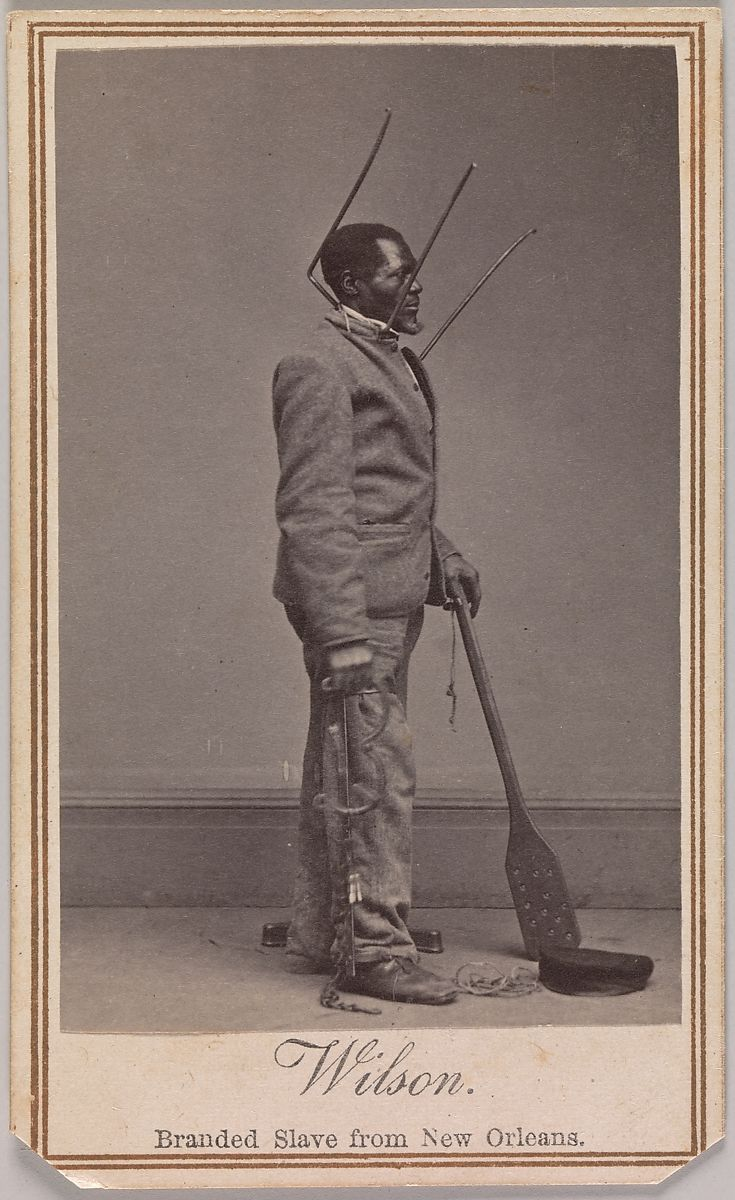
Wilson Chinn, a branded slave from Louisiana--became one of the most widely circulated photos of the abolitionist movement during the American Civil War

The American Civil War began with the stated goal of preserving the Union, and Lincoln said repeatedly that on the topic of slavery, he was only opposed to its spread to the Western territories. This view of the war progressively changed, one step at a time, as public sentiment evolved, until by 1865 the war was seen in the North as primarily concerned with ending slavery. The first federal act taken against slavery during the war occurred on 16 April 1862, when Lincoln signed the District of Columbia Compensated Emancipation Act, which abolished slavery in Washington, D.C. A few months later, on June 19, Congress banned slavery in all federal territories, fulfilling Lincoln's 1860 campaign promise. Meanwhile, the Union suddenly found itself dealing with a steady stream of thousands of escaped slaves, achieving freedom, or so they hoped, by crossing Union lines. In response, Congress passed the Confiscation Acts, which essentially declared escaped slaves from the South to be confiscated war property, and thus did not have to be returned to their Confederate owners. Although the initial act did not mention emancipation, the Second Confiscation Act, enacted on 17 July 1862, stated that escaped or liberated slaves belonging to anyone who participated in or supported the rebellion "shall be deemed captives of war, and shall be forever free of their servitude, and not again held as slaves." Pro-Union forces gained control of the border states of Maryland, Missouri, and West Virginia; all three states would abolish slavery before the end of the war. Lincoln issued the Emancipation Proclamation, effective 1 January 1863, which declared only those slaves in Confederate states to be free. The United States Colored Troops began operations in 1863. The Fugitive Slave Act of 1850 was repealed in June 1864. Eventually support for abolition was enough to pass the Thirteenth Amendment, ratified in December 1865, which abolished slavery everywhere in the United States, freeing more than 50,000 people still enslaved in Kentucky and Delaware, in 1865 the only states in which slavery still existed. The Thirteenth Amendment also abolished slavery among the Native American tribes.

== Variations by area ==
=== Abolition in the North ===
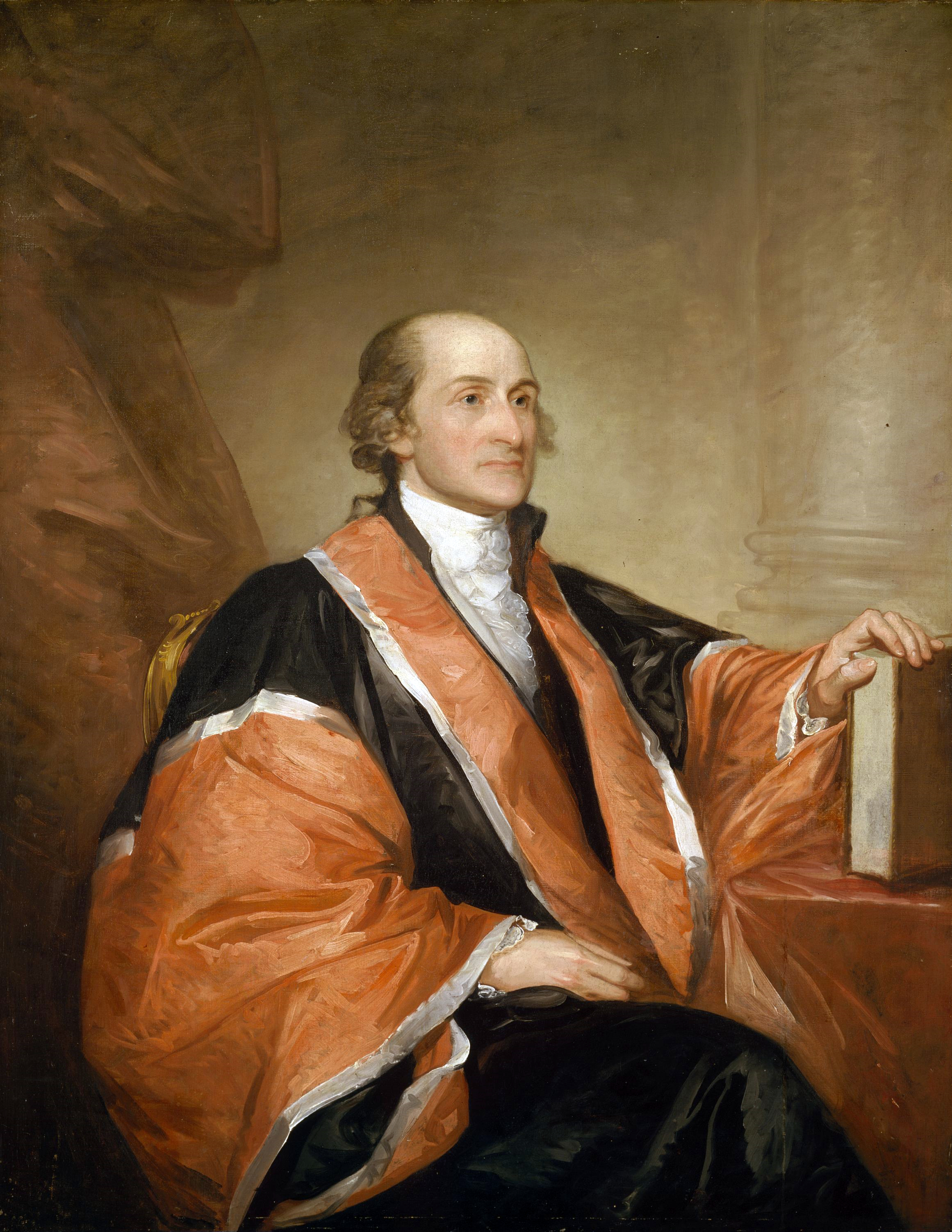
John Jay (1745–1829), a founder of the New York Manumission Society in 1785

The abolitionist movement began about the time of the United States' independence. Quakers played a big role. The first abolition organization was the Pennsylvania Abolition Society, which first met in 1775; Benjamin Franklin was its president. The New York Manumission Society was founded in 1785 by powerful politicians: John Jay, Alexander Hamilton, and Aaron Burr.

There is quite a bit of confusion about when slavery was abolished in the Northern states, because "abolishing slavery" meant different things in different states. (Theodore Weld, in his pamphlet opposing slavery in the District of Columbia, gives a detailed chronology.) It is true that beginning with the independent Republic of Vermont in 1777, all states north of the Ohio River and the Mason–Dixon line that separated Pennsylvania from Maryland passed laws that abolished slavery, although in some cases this did not apply to existing slaves, only their future offspring. These included the first abolition laws in the entire New World: the Massachusetts Constitution, adopted in 1780, declared all men to have rights, making slavery unenforceable, and it disappeared through the individual actions of both masters and slaves.

However, what the abolition forces passed in 1799 in New York State was an Act for the gradual abolition of slavery. Slavery in New York did not officially end until 1827, and more than 70 enslaved people in New York appeared on the 1830 decennial census. No slaves appeared in the state's 1840 census. New Jersey abolished slavery in 1804, but in 1860 a dozen black people were still held as "perpetual apprentices".

In the Northwest Ordinance of 1787, the Congress of the Confederation prohibited slavery in the territories northwest of the Ohio River.

At the Constitutional Convention of 1787, slavery was the most contentious topic. Outright prohibition of slavery was impossible, because the Southern states (Georgia, South Carolina, North Carolina, Virginia, Maryland, and Delaware) would never have agreed to it. The only restriction on slavery that was agreed to was to allow Congress to prohibit the importation of slaves, and even that was postponed for 20 years. By that time, all the states except South Carolina had laws abolishing or severely limiting the importation of slaves. When 1808 approached, then-President Thomas Jefferson, in his 1806 annual message to Congress (State of the Union), proposed legislation, approved by Congress with little controversy in 1807, prohibiting the importation of slaves into the United States effective the first day the Constitution permitted, January 1, 1808. As he put it, this would "withdraw the citizens of the United States from all further participation in those violations of human rights...which the morality, the reputation, and the best of our country have long been eager to proscribe". However, about 1,000 slaves per year continued to be illegally brought (smuggled) into the United States; see Wanderer and Clotilda. This was primarily via Spanish Florida and the Gulf Coast; the United States acquired Florida from Spain in 1819, effective 1821, in part as a slave-control measure: no imports coming in, and certainly no fugitives escaping into a refuge.

Congress declined to pass any restriction on the lucrative interstate slave trade, which expanded to replace the supply of African slaves (see Slavery in the United States#Slave trade).

=== Manumission by Southern owners ===
After 1776, Quaker and Moravian advocates helped persuade numerous slaveholders in the Upper South to free their slaves. Manumissions increased for nearly two decades. Many individual acts by slaveholders freed thousands of slaves. Slaveholders freed slaves in such numbers that the percentage of free black people in the Upper South increased from 1 to 10 percent, with most of that increase in Virginia, Maryland and Delaware. By 1810 three-quarters of blacks in Delaware were free. The most notable of men offering freedom was Robert Carter III of Virginia, who freed more than 450 people by "Deed of Gift", filed in 1791. This number was more slaves than any single American had freed before or after. Often slaveholders came to their decisions by their own struggles in the Revolution; their wills and deeds frequently cited language about the equality of men supporting the decision to set slaves free. The era's changing economy also encouraged slaveholders to release slaves. Planters were shifting from labor-intensive tobacco to mixed-crop cultivation and needed fewer slaves.

By 1860, 91.7% of the blacks in Delaware and 49.7% of those in Maryland were free. Such early free families often formed the core of artisans, professionals, preachers, and teachers in future generations. However, this did not signal racial equality. Though free from slavery, blacks still faced immense discrimination. For example, Delaware affirmed and reaffirmed black disenfranchisement several times throughout the late 18th and 19th centuries. Delaware's General Assembly enacted harsh black codes throughout the 19th century that restricted travel, property ownership, expression, and socialization for African Americans.

=== Western territories ===
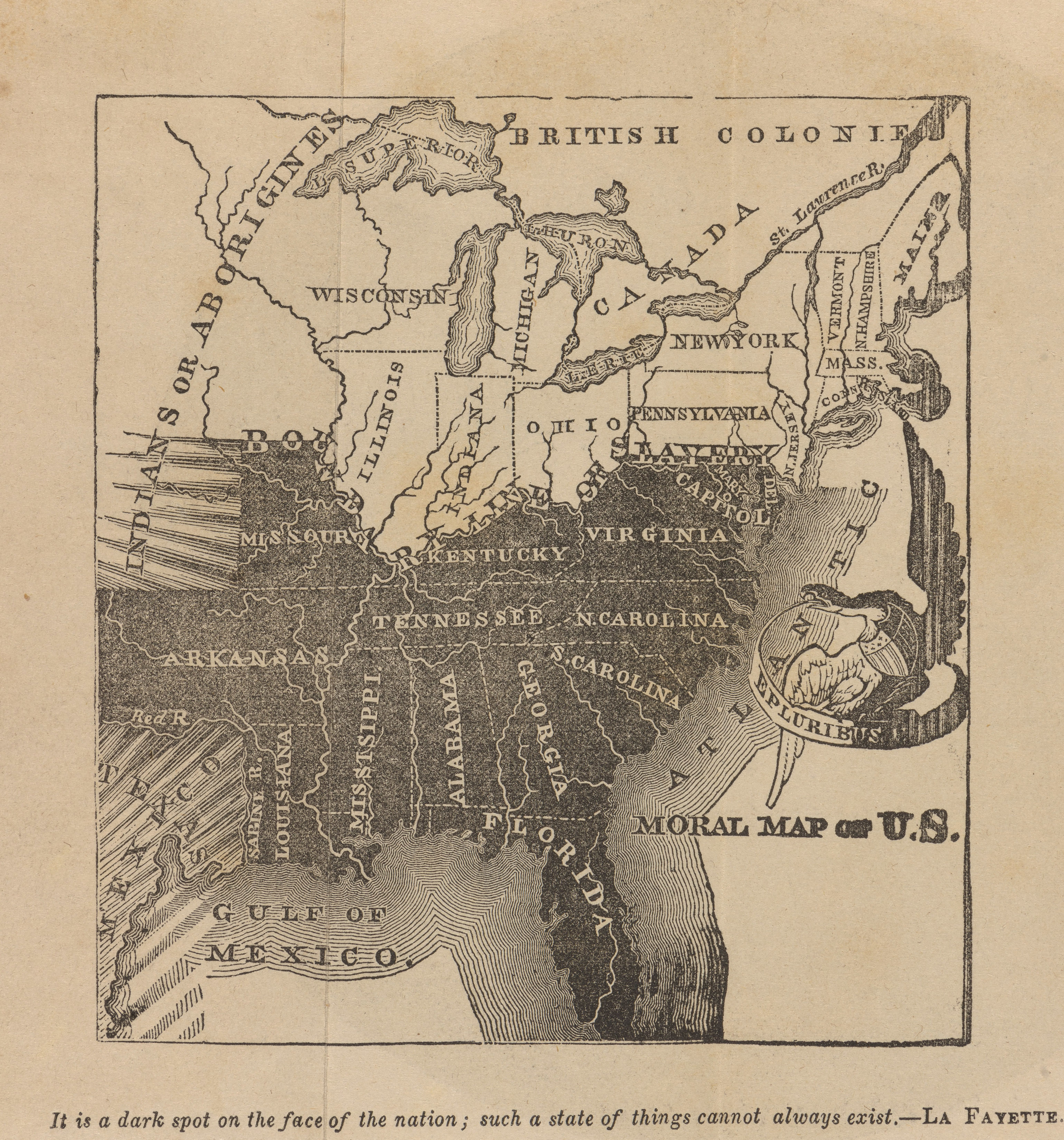
This anti-slavery map shows the slave states in black, with black-and-white shading representing the threatened spread of slavery into Texas and the western territories.

During Congressional debate in 1820 on the proposed Tallmadge Amendment, which sought to limit slavery in Missouri as it became a state, Rufus King declared that "laws or compacts imposing any such condition [slavery] upon any human being are absolutely void, because contrary to the law of nature, which is the law of God, by which he makes his ways known to man, and is paramount to all human control". The amendment failed and Missouri became a slave state. According to historian David Brion Davis, this may have been the first time in the world that a political leader openly attacked slavery's perceived legality in such a radical manner.

Beginning in the 1830s, the U.S. Postmaster General refused to allow the mails to carry abolition pamphlets to the South. Northern teachers suspected of abolitionism were expelled from the South, and abolitionist literature was banned. One Northerner, Amos Dresser (1812–1904), in 1835 was tried in Nashville, Tennessee, for possessing anti-slavery publications, convicted, and as punishment was whipped publicly. Southerners rejected the denials of Republicans that they were abolitionists. They pointed to John Brown's attempt in 1859 to start a slave uprising as proof that multiple Northern conspiracies were afoot to ignite slave rebellions. Although some abolitionists did call for slave revolts, no evidence of any other Brown-like conspiracy has been discovered. The North felt threatened as well, for as Eric Foner concludes, "northerners came to view slavery as the very antithesis of the good society, as well as a threat to their own fundamental values and interests". The famous, "fiery" abolitionist Abby Kelley Foster, from Massachusetts, was considered an "ultra" abolitionist who believed in full civil rights for all black people. She held to the view that the freed slaves would colonize Liberia. Parts of the anti-slavery movement became known as "Abby Kellyism". She recruited Susan B Anthony and Lucy Stone to the movement. Effingham Capron, a cotton and textile scion, who attended the Quaker meeting where Abby Kelley Foster and her family were members, became a prominent abolitionist at the local, state, and national levels. The local anti-slavery society at Uxbridge, Massachusetts, had more than 25% of the town's population as members.

== Constituencies ==
Historian James M. McPherson in 1964 defined an abolitionist "as one who before the Civil War had agitated for the immediate, unconditional and total abolition of slavery in the United States". He notes that many historians have used a broader definition without his emphasis on immediacy. Thus he does not include opponents of slavery such as Abraham Lincoln or the Republican Party; they called for the immediate end to expansion of slavery before 1861.

As such, abolitionism in the United States was identified by historians as an expression of moralism, it often operated in tandem with another social reform effort, the temperance movement. Slavery was also attacked, to a lesser degree, as harmful on economic grounds. Evidence was that the South, with many enslaved African Americans on plantations, was definitely poorer than the North, which had few.

=== Black Americans ===
Historians and scholars have largely overlooked the work of black abolitionists; instead, they have focused on only a few black abolitionists, such as Frederick Douglass. Yet lesser-known black abolitionists, such as Martin Delany and James Monroe Whitfield, also played an undeniably large role in shaping the movement. Black abolitionists had the distinct problem of having to confront an often-hostile American public, while still acknowledging their nationality and struggle. As a result, many black abolitionists "intentionally adopted aspects of British, New England, and Midwestern cultures". Furthermore, much of abolitionist rhetoric, and black abolitionist rhetoric in particular, were influenced by the Puritan preaching heritage.

==== Frederick Douglass ====
Frederick Douglass was a notable black abolitionist, who significantly contributed to the transnational abolitionist movement through his lecture tours of the United Kingdom from 1845 to 1847. In particular, he had a connection with Daniel O'Connell: Both O'Connell and Douglass strongly opposed slavery. On 4 October 1845, the British and Foreign Anti-Slavery Society gave Douglass a Bible bound in gold. African Americans, with Douglass being a key example, were involving themselves in US foreign relations and influencing British anti-slavery rhetoric. Douglass was best known for his speeches, and he completed 280 lectures across the UK and Ireland in the 19 months that he was there. Black abolitionist rhetoric discussed relationships between power, race, and the popular imagination, showing the complexities of the morality and representation of the abolitionist debate. Douglass and other black nationalists capitalised on pre-existing political and ideological debates among the UK to reassert the need for abolitionism.

==== Black women ====
In general, Black female abolitionists had separate motives and rhetorical strategies than White female abolitionists. They were often middle class and members of literary societies; the ones to which they belonged were often made up of solely Black women. In their activist efforts, they held themselves to high moral standards to be viewed as legitimate by others. Sarah Mapps Douglass, a free-born Quaker who wrote articles for The Liberator on abolition also served as the secretary for a literary society for women in Philadelphia, where she emphasized the importance of education and morality for Black women.

Black women that escaped slavery would sometimes write and publish their slave narratives as a way to argue for abolition. In opposition to male slave narratives, like Frederick Douglass's, which highlighted literacy, Black women emphasized the communities and relationships they formed as keys to their humanity and right to freedom. They were also keen to highlight their relationship to motherhood, so as to emphasize their shared traits with white women and the ways in which they too could meet traditional expectations of white women. Harriet Jacobs's Incidents in the Life of a Slave Girl showcases her grandmother as the matriarch of her family, which shows how enslaved mothers are capable of nurturing like valued white women.

Black women also played their role in the abolitionist movement, both domestically and internationally, showing involvement in US Foreign Relations. One notable example was Harriet Jacobs, who produced letters in England reflecting on her experiences as a slave in the US to challenge the pro-slavery movement in the USA. The London Emancipation Committee published her letters into a book, titled: The Deeper Wrong: Incidents in the Life of a Slave Girl, Written by Herself. The book was not just noticed in reform journals, but in the mainstream press. Lengthy British reviews show how the book helped abolitionists win public support in Britain. Black abolitionist rhetoric could be done in literary form, a way for black women to have influence in an international abolitionist movement.

==== Black abolitionist rhetoric in the Caribbean and South America ====
Black abolitionist rhetoric was not only a transatlantic movement between Britain and the US, it also had influence in the Caribbean and South America. The 1833 legal case Mundrucu v Barker also carried international importance in the abolitionist campaign. In taking a stand against segregation, a black Brazilian immigrant had focused worldwide attention on racism in slaveholding US society. Here there was division between white Philadelphians who saw black Saint Dominguan refugees as a threat to the city and country's racial order, their way of trying to justify slavery. This shows the connection between attitudes towards segregation and slavery helped shape black abolitionist rhetoric. This led to domestic organisations being established by interracial communities, such as the Boston Female Anti-Slavery Society.

Working as Jamaican-based writers for New York newspapers between 1840 and 1851, the two black US-Jamaican brothers, Henry and George Davison provided inter-American perspectives on abolitionism. Henry wrote letters to the National Anti-Slavery Standard. Black Americans had opportunities to write for newspapers, providing publicity and discussion of abolitionist rhetoric. Slavery was moving beyond internal US divisions, but reaching influence outside of the USA. Black abolitionist rhetoric was not simply an African-American activity, but involved South American and Caribbean individuals too, showing an international movement.

=== Women ===
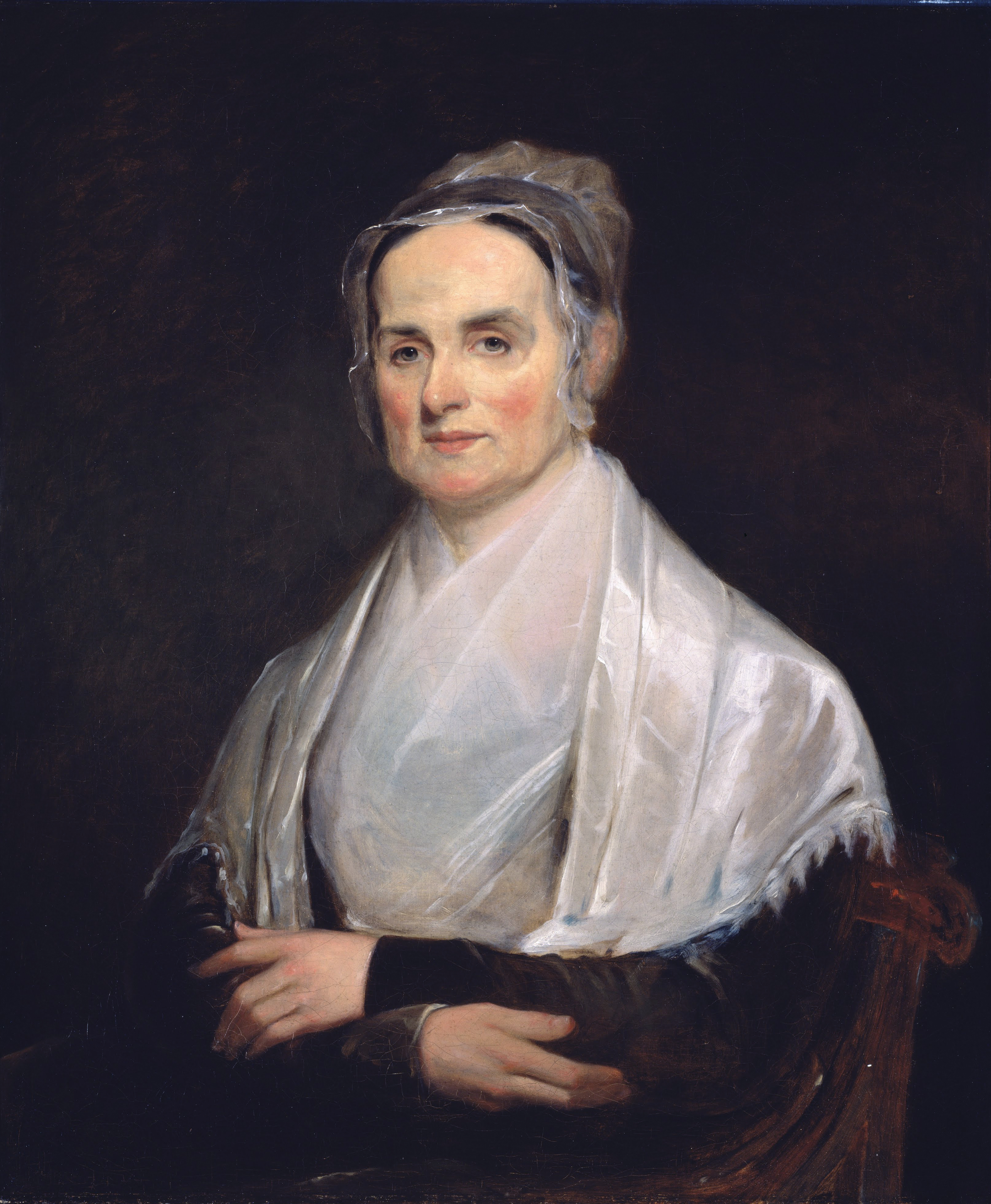
Like many Quakers, Lucretia Mott considered slavery an evil to be opposed.

William Lloyd Garrison's abolitionist newsletter the Liberator noted in 1847, "the Anti-Slavery cause cannot stop to estimate where the greatest indebtedness lies, but whenever the account is made up there can be no doubt that the efforts and sacrifices of the WOMEN, who helped it, will hold a most honorable and conspicuous position." As the Liberator states, women played a crucial role as leaders in the anti-slavery movement.

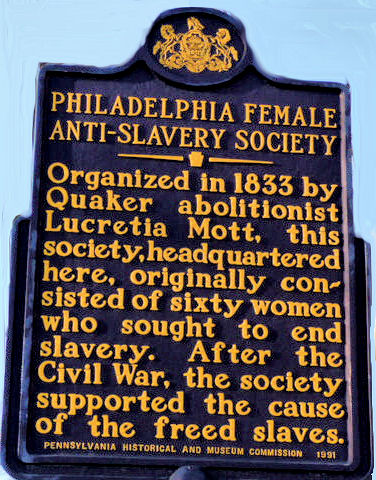
Plaque commemorating the founding of the Female Anti-Slavery Society in Philadelphia in 1833

Angelina and Sarah Grimké were the first female anti-slavery agents, and played a variety of roles in the abolitionist movement. Though born in the South, the Grimké sisters became disillusioned with slavery and moved North to get away from it. Perhaps because of their birthplace, the Grimké sisters' critiques carried particular weight and specificity. Angelina Grimké spoke of her thrill at seeing white men do manual labor of any kind. Their perspectives as native Southerners as well as women, brought a new important point of view to the abolitionist movement. In 1836, they moved to New York and began work for the Anti-Slavery Society, where they met and were impressed by William Lloyd Garrison. The sisters wrote many pamphlets (Angelina's "Appeal to the Christian Women of the South" was the only appeal directly to Southern women to defy slavery laws) and played leadership roles at the first Anti-Slavery Convention of American Women in 1837. The Grimkés later made a notable speaking tour around the north, which culminated in Angelina's February 1838 address to a Committee of the Legislature of Massachusetts.

Lucretia Mott was also active in the abolitionist movement. Though well known for her women's suffrage advocacy, Mott also played an important role in the abolitionist movement. During four decades, she delivered sermons about abolitionism, women's rights, and a host of other issues. Mott acknowledged her Quaker beliefs' determinative role in affecting her abolitionist sentiment. She spoke of the "duty (that) was impressed upon me at the time I consecrated myself to that Gospel which anoints 'to preach deliverance to the captive, to set at liberty them that are bruised ..." Mott's advocacy took a variety of forms: she worked with the Free Produce Society to boycott slave-made goods, volunteered with the Philadelphia Female Anti-Slavery Convention of American Women, and helped slaves escape to free territory.

Abby Kelley Foster, with a strong Quaker heritage, helped lead Susan B. Anthony and Lucy Stone into the abolition movement, and encouraged them to take on a role in political activism. She helped organize and was a key speaker at

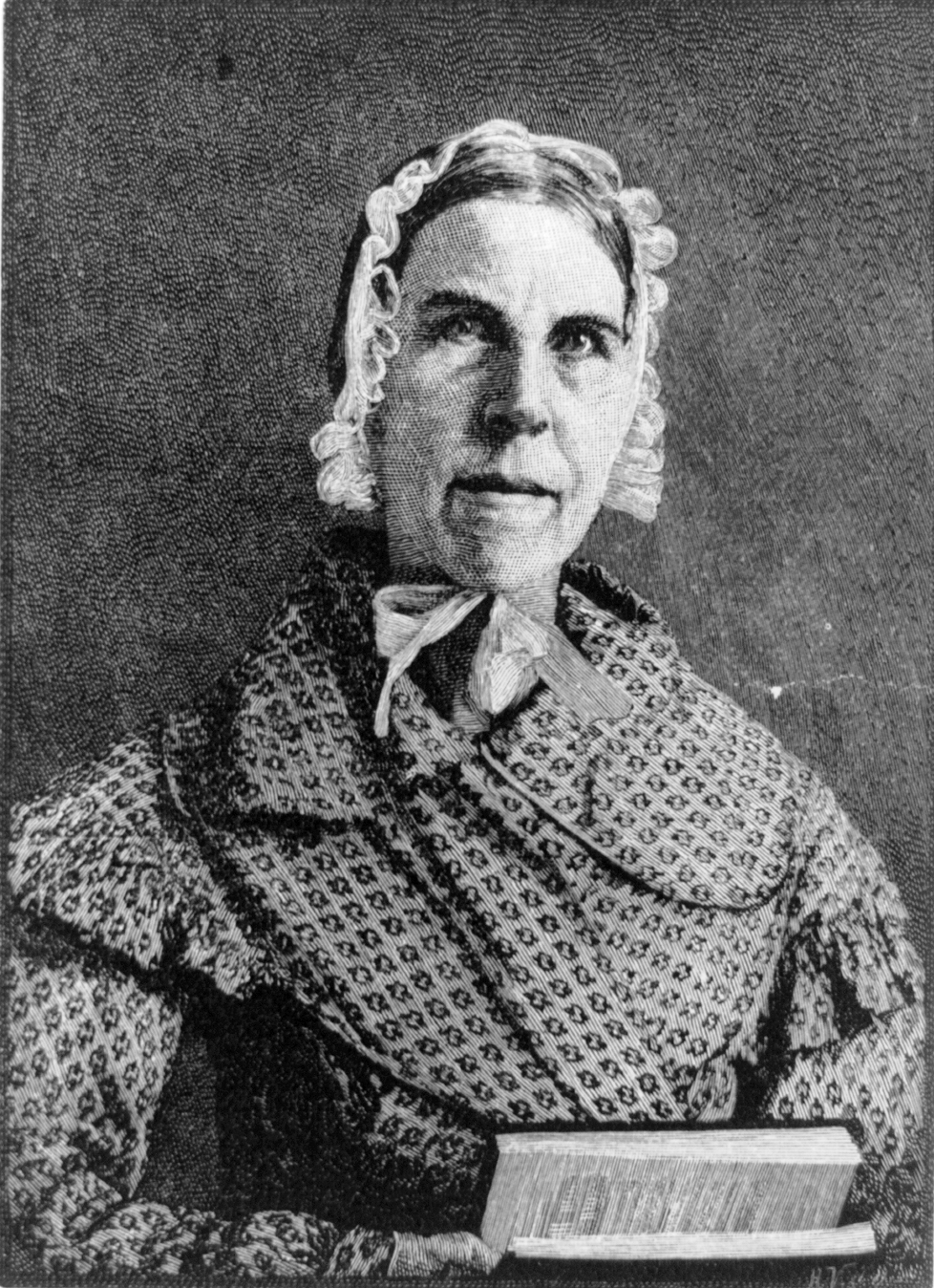
Sarah Moore Grimké (1792–1873), abolitionist and women's rights advocate

the first National Women's Rights Convention, held in Worcester, Massachusetts, in 1850. (The better-known Seneca Falls Convention, held in 1848, was not national). She was an "ultra" abolitionist who believed in immediate and complete civil rights for all slaves. Since 1841, however, she had resigned from the Quakers over disputes about not allowing anti-slavery speakers in meeting houses (including the Uxbridge monthly meeting where she had attended with her family), and the group disowned her. Abby Kelley became a leading speaker and the leading fundraiser for the American Anti-slavery Society. Radical abolitionism became known as "Abby Kelleyism".

Other leaders in the abolitionist movement were Lydia Maria Child, Elizabeth Cady Stanton, Susan B. Anthony, Harriet Tubman, and Sojourner Truth. But even beyond these well-known women, abolitionism maintained impressive support from white middle-class and some black women. It was these women who performed many of the logistical, day-to-day tasks that made the movement successful. They raised money, wrote and distributed propaganda pieces, drafted and signed petitions, and lobbied the legislatures. Though abolitionism sowed the seeds of the women's rights movement, most women became involved in abolitionism because of a gendered religious worldview, and the idea that they had feminine, moral responsibilities. For example, in the winter of 1831–1832, women sent three petitions to the Virginia legislature, advocating emancipation of the state's slave population. The only precedent for such action was Catharine Beecher's organization of a petition protesting the Cherokee removal. The Virginia petitions, while the first of their kind, were by no means the last. Similar backing increased leading up to the Civil War.

Even as women played crucial roles in abolitionism, the movement simultaneously helped stimulate women's-rights efforts. A full 10 years before the Seneca Falls Convention, the Grimké sisters were travelling and lecturing about their experiences with slavery. As Gerda Lerner says, the Grimkés understood their actions' great impact. "In working for the liberation of the slave," Lerner writes, "Sarah and Angelina Grimké found the key to their own liberation. And the consciousness of the significance of their actions was clearly before them. 'We Abolition Women are turning the world upside down.'"

Women gained important experiences in public speaking and organizing that stood them in good stead going forward. The Grimké sisters' public speaking played a critical part in legitimizing women's place in the public sphere. Some Christian women created cent societies to benefit abolition movements, where many women in a church would each pledge to donate one cent a week to help abolitionist causes.

Even though women were not allowed full access to political and religious spaces, they still played a big role in the abolitionist movement through both public activism and behind-the-scenes activism. As historian Julie Roy Jeffrey explains, a lot of women relied on their religious faith and authority to speak out against slavery and challenge male-led church systems that tried to keep them quiet. They believed slavery went against Christian values and saw it as a deep moral wrong. In their speeches and writing, they made it clear that true faith could not exist alongside a system that discriminated against people. Women like Sarah Otis Ernst and Maria Child used persuasive writing, public speeches, and organizing work to fight not just slavery, but also the powerful systems that kept it going. Ernst was a strong Garrisonian who got frustrated when mainstream abolitionists started watering down their message. She did not like that people in the movement were trying to be more politically strategic instead of sticking to the original beliefs, like full racial equality, immediate emancipation, and refusing to work with pro-slavery systems. At the 1852 American and Foreign Antislavery Society convention, around two-thirds of the 2,000 people there were women. That says a lot about how involved women were, even though they often got written out of the story. They could not vote, but they used writing, speeches, and journalism to influence politics and public opinion. Their activism was real, public, and tied directly into national conversations.

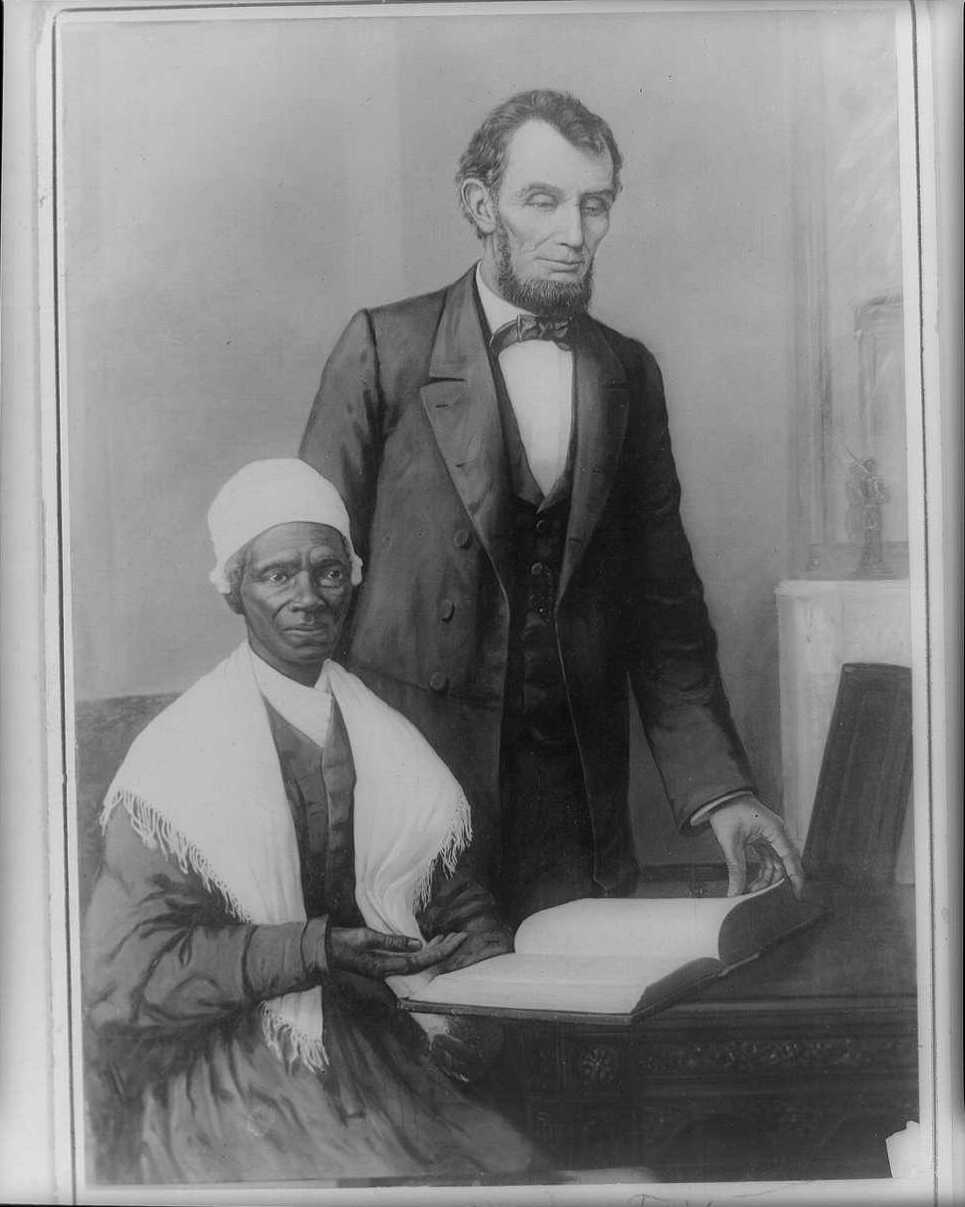
Sojourner Truth meeting President Abraham Lincoln in 1864, symbolizing her role in both abolition and civil rights advocacy.

But not all women approached the movement the same way. There were clear differences between how white and Black women operated, and sometimes those differences caused conflict. White women, especially ones who were more religious, focused a lot on the moral and spiritual arguments. They used Christian values to call out slavery as a sin and tried to appeal to other white Americans by framing it as a moral crisis. For example, Lydia Maria Child wrote about Christian duty and compassion to get people on board. But that type of activism did not always connect with what Black women were facing every day. And even inside the abolitionist circles, Black women were still often pushed to the side. They were not always given speaking time, leadership roles, or space in published work. Sojourner Truth had to fight just to speak at some events, and even then, people questioned her. White women could usually speak and be heard if they used moral language. Black women had to work twice as hard just to get into the room. They faced racism from inside the movement and also from the outside world, which made it even harder for their voices to be heard.

Stephanie J. Richmond talks about how central Black women were to abolition, even though they have been left out of most of the history. "Women like Sojourner Truth, Maria Stewart, and Harriet Tubman struggled not only for the abolition of slavery but for gender and racial equality as well". They were not just giving speeches, they were founding antislavery groups, organizing communities, and building transatlantic networks. They were working through both racism and sexism and still finding ways to be powerful voices. Truth's line "Ain’t I a Woman?" and Stewart saying she had to "stand for justice wherever I find it" show how they were calling out not just slavery, but the whole system that tried to silence them. Harriet Tubman took a different route; she led people to freedom through the Underground Railroad and even worked for the Union Army. Black women's abolitionism looked different from that of white women. It was rooted in their personal experience and often more direct and action-focused. They made sure the fight for abolition was not just about ending slavery, but also about achieving full equality and justice.

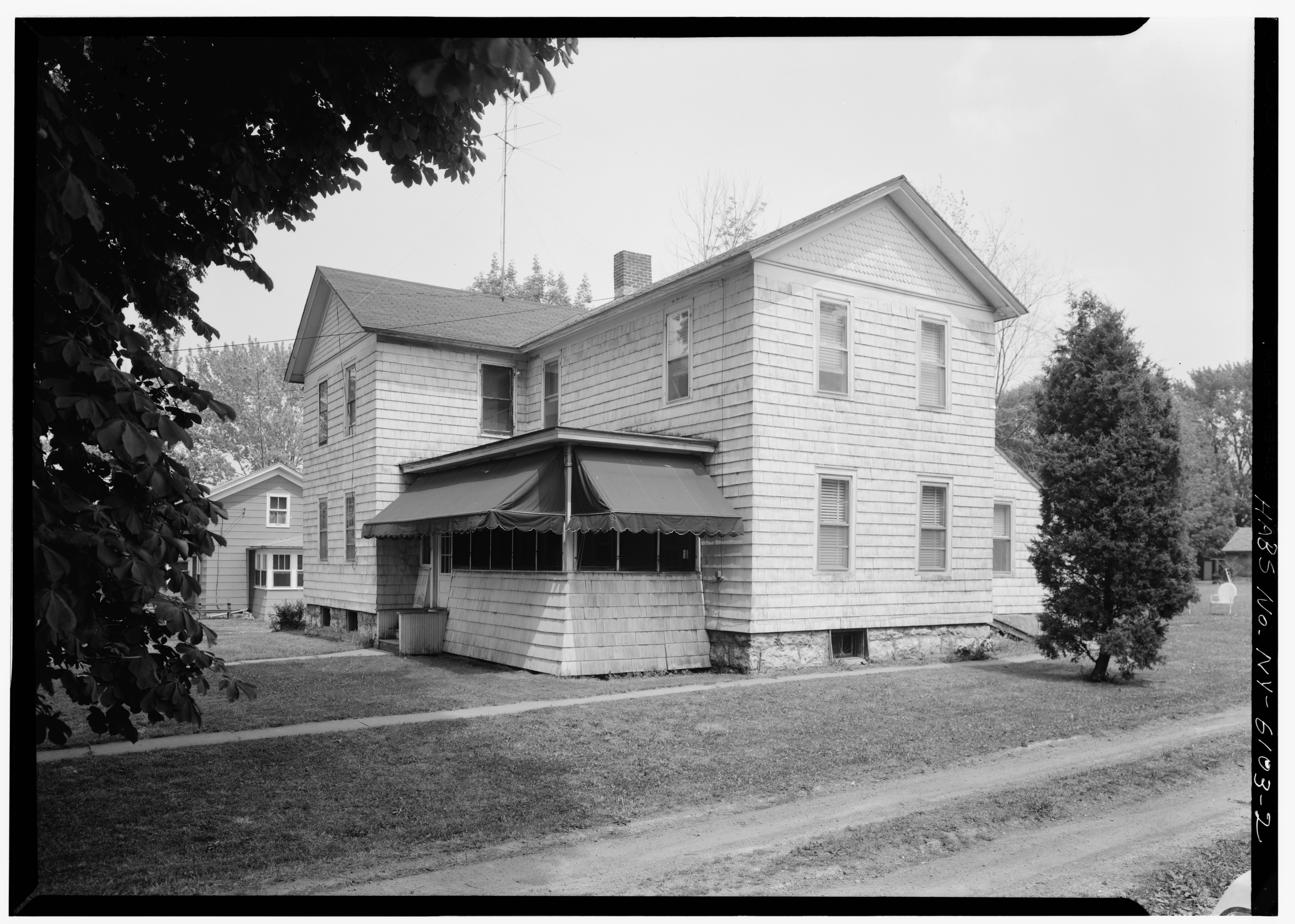
Elizabeth Cady Stanton House in Seneca Falls, New York, home of the pioneering women's rights leader and site of early activism

The July 1848 Seneca Falls Convention grew out of a partnership between Lucretia Mott and Elizabeth Cady Stanton that blossomed while the two worked, at first, on abolitionist issues. Indeed, the two met at the World's Anti-Slavery Convention in the summer of 1840. Mott brought oratorical skills and an impressive reputation as an abolitionist to the nascent women's rights movement.

Abolitionism brought together active women and enabled them to make political and personal connections while honing communication and organizational skills. Even Sojourner Truth, commonly associated with abolitionism, delivered her first documented public speech at the 1850 National Women's Rights Convention in Worcester. There, she argued for women's reform activism.

=== Churches ===
The religious component of American abolitionism was great. It began with the Quakers, then moved to the other Protestants with the Second Great Awakening of the early 19th century. Many leaders were ministers. Saying slavery was sinful made its evil easy to understand, and tended to arouse fervor for the cause. The debate about slavery was often based on what the Bible said or did not say about it. John Brown, who had studied the Bible for the ministry, proclaimed that he was "an instrument of God".

The Second Great Awakening of the 1820s and 1830s in religion inspired groups that undertook many types of social reform. For some that included the immediate abolition of slavery as they considered it sinful to hold slaves as well as to tolerate slavery. Opposition to slavery, for example, was one of the works of piety of the Methodist churches, which were established by John Wesley. "Abolitionist" had several meanings at the time. The followers of William Lloyd Garrison, including Wendell Phillips and Frederick Douglass, demanded the "immediate abolition of slavery", hence the name, also called "immediatism". A more pragmatic group of abolitionists, such as Theodore Weld and Arthur Tappan, wanted immediate action, but were willing to support a program of gradual emancipation, with a long intermediate stage.

The formation of Christian denominations that heralded abolitionism as a moral issue occurred, such as the organization of Wesleyan Methodist Connection by Orange Scott in 1843, and the formation of the Free Methodist Church by Benjamin Titus Roberts in 1860 (which is reflected in the name of Church). The True Wesleyan a periodical founded by Orange Scott and Jotham Horton was used to disseminate abolitionist views. The Methodist and Quaker branches of Christianity played an integral part in the formulation of abolitionist ideology in the United States.

"Anti-slavery men", such as John Quincy Adams, did not call slavery a sin. They called it an evil feature of society as a whole. They did what they could to limit slavery and end it where possible, but were not part of any abolitionist group. For example, in 1841, John Quincy Adams represented the Amistad African slaves in the Supreme Court of the United States and argued that they should be set free. In the last years before the war, "anti-slavery" could refer to the Northern majority, such as Abraham Lincoln, who opposed expansion of slavery or its influence, as by the Kansas–Nebraska Act or the Fugitive Slave Act. Many Southerners called all these abolitionists, without distinguishing them from the Garrisonians.

Historian James Stewart (1976) explains the abolitionists' deep beliefs: "All people were equal in God's sight; the souls of black folks were as valuable as those of whites; for one of God's children to enslave another was a violation of the Higher Law, even if it was sanctioned by the Constitution."

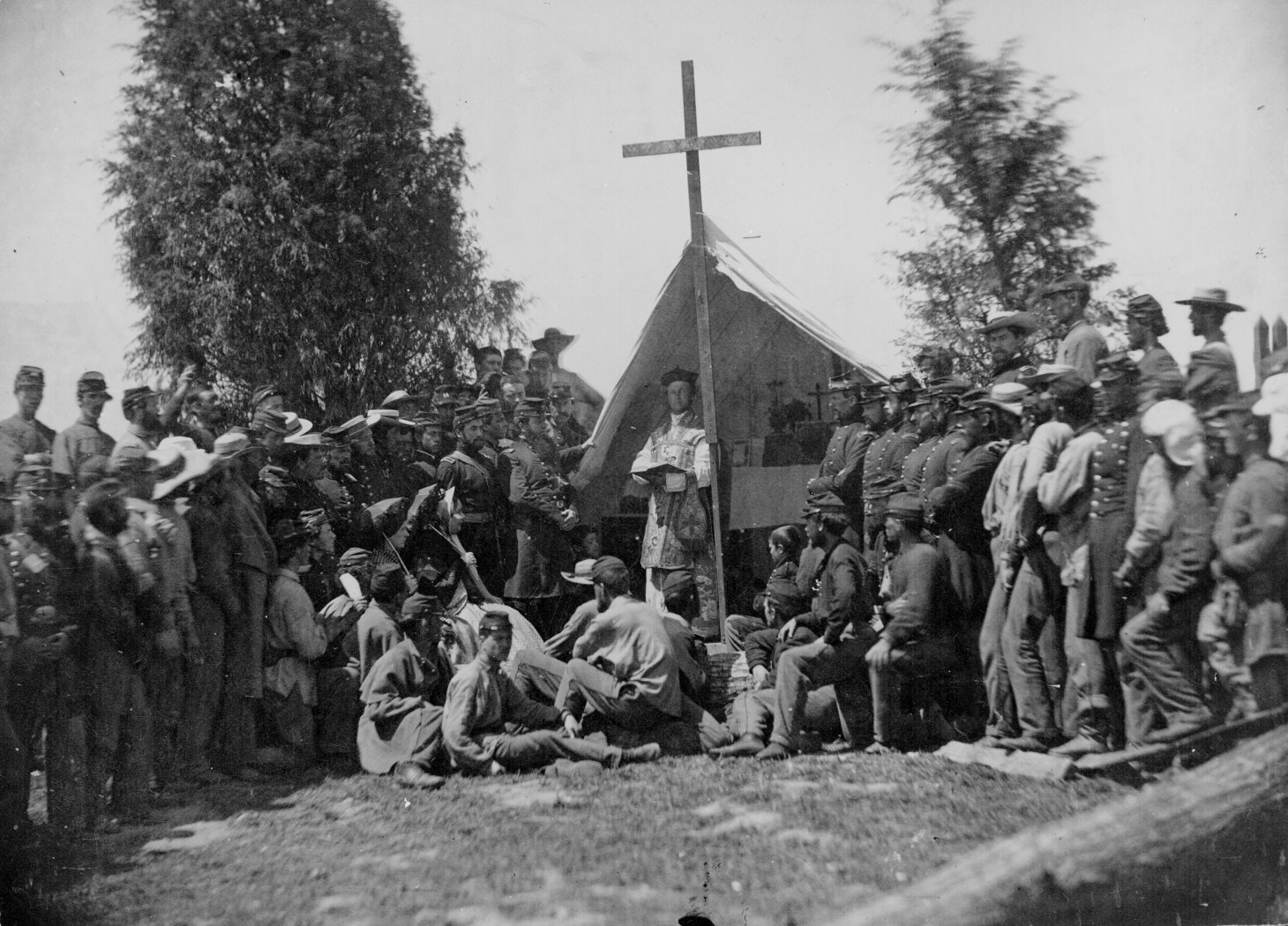
Officers and men of the Irish-Catholic 69th New York Volunteer Regiment attend Catholic services in 1861.

Irish Catholics in the United States seldom challenged the role of slavery in society as it was protected at that time by the U.S. Constitution. They viewed the abolitionists as anti-Catholic and anti-Irish. Irish Catholics were generally well received by Democrats in the South.

In contrast, most Irish Nationalists and Fenians supported the abolition of slavery. Daniel O'Connell, the Catholic leader of the Irish in Ireland, supported abolition in the United States. He organized a petition in Ireland with 60,000 signatures urging the Irish of the United States to support abolition. John O'Mahony, a founder of the Irish Republican Brotherhood was an abolitionist and served as colonel in the 69th Infantry Regiment during the Civil War.

The Irish Catholics in the United States were recent immigrants; most were poor and very few owned slaves. They had to compete with free blacks for unskilled labor jobs. They saw abolitionism as the militant wing of evangelical anti-Catholic Protestantism.

The Catholic Church in the United States had long ties in slaveholding Maryland and Louisiana. Despite a firm stand for the spiritual equality of black people, and the resounding condemnation of slavery by Pope Gregory XVI in his bull In supremo apostolatus issued in 1839, the American church continued in deeds, if not in public discourse, to avoid confrontation with slave-holding interests. In 1861, the Archbishop of New York wrote to Secretary of War Cameron: "That the Church is opposed to slavery ... Her doctrine on that subject is, that it is a crime to reduce men naturally free to a condition of servitude and bondage, as slaves." No American bishop supported extra-political abolition or interference with states' rights before the Civil War.

The secular Germans of the Forty-Eighter immigration were largely anti-slavery. Prominent Forty-Eighters included Carl Schurz and Friedrich Hecker. German Lutherans seldom took a position on slavery, but German Methodists were anti-slavery.

=== Colleges ===
==== Western Reserve College ====
Both Garrison's newspaper The Liberator and his book Thoughts on African Colonization (1832) arrived shortly after publication at Western Reserve College, in Hudson, Ohio, which was briefly the center of abolitionist discourse in the United States. (John Brown grew up in Hudson.) The readers, including college president Charles Backus Storrs, found Garrison's arguments and evidence convincing. Abolition versus colonization rapidly became the primary issue on the campus, to the point that Storrs complained in writing that nothing else was being discussed.

The college's chaplain and theology professor Beriah Green said that "his Thoughts and his paper (The Liberator) are worthy of the eye and the heart of every American." Green delivered in the college chapel in November and December 1832 four sermons supporting immediate abolition of slavery. These so offended the college's trustees, more conservative than either the students or the faculty, that Green resigned, expecting that he would be fired. Elizur Wright, another professor, resigned soon afterwards and became the first secretary of the American Anti-Slavery Society, of which Green was the first president. Storrs contracted tuberculosis, took a leave of absence, and died within six months. This left the school with only one of its four professors.

==== Oneida Institute for Science and Industry ====
Green was soon hired as the new president of the Oneida Institute. Under the previous president, George Washington Gale, there had been a mass walkout of students; among the issues was Gale's lack of support for abolition.

He accepted the position on conditions that 1) he be allowed to preach "immediatism", immediate emancipation, and 2) that African-American students be admitted on the same terms as white students. These were accepted, and we know the names of 16 Blacks who studied there. Native American students, of whom we know the names of two, were openly accepted as well.

Under Green, Oneida became "a hotbed of anti-slavery activity." It was "abolitionist to the core, more so than any other American college." For Presbyterian minister and Bible professor Green, slavery was not just an evil but a sin, and abolitionism was what Christ's principles mandated. Under him a cadre of abolitionists was trained, who then carried the abolitionist message, via lectures and sermons, throughout the North. Many future well-known black leaders and abolitionists were students at Oneida while Green was president. These include William Forten (son of James Forten), Alexander Crummell, Rev. Henry Highland Garnet and Rev. Amos Noë Freeman.

==== Lane Seminary ====
The Oneida Institute did not have an incident, like that of Western Reserve, which brought national attention to it. Its successor, Lane Seminary, in Cincinnati, did.

"Lane was Oneida moved west." Leading the exodus from Oneida was a former Oneida student, and private student of Gale before that, Theodore Dwight Weld. He greatly impressed the philanthropist brothers and abolitionists Arthur and Lewis Tappan. They hired him to report on the movement nationally, and specifically to find a new location for their funding, since Oneida, a manual labor school, was a disappointment, according to Weld and his student followers. (The manual labor school movement had students work about 3 hours a day on farms or in small factories or plants, such as Oneida's printing shop, and was intended to provide needy students with funds for their education – a form of work-study – while at the same time providing them the newly recognized physical and psychological (spiritual) benefits of exercise.)

At the same time that Weld was scouting a location for a new school, the barely-functioning Lane Seminary was looking for students. Based on Weld's recommendation, the Tappans started giving Lane the financial support they had previously given Oneida. Weld, though on paper enrolled as a student at Lane, was de facto its head, choosing, through his recommendations to the Tappans, the president (Lyman Beecher, after Charles Grandison Finney, who became later the second president of Oberlin, turned it down), and telling the trustees whom to hire.

The group of students led by Weld constituted the first student movement in the history of the country. He left Oneida, and they did. He chose Lane, and they followed him there. When he soon left Lane for another new, struggling institution, Oberlin, they did so too, as a group.

Students, many of whom considered him the real leader of Lane, responded to Weld's announcement of the new school in Cincinnati.

[Y]oung men gathered in Cincinnati "as from the hives of the north". Most of them were from western New York. H. B. Stanton and a few others from Rochester floated down the Ohio from Pittsburgh on a raft. More than a score came from Oneida Institute. Even more arrived from Utica and Auburn, Finney's converts all. From Tennessee came Weld's disciple, Marius Robinson, and across the Ohio from Kentucky came James Thome, scion of a wealthy planting family. Up from Alabama journeyed two others of Weld's disciples, the sons of the Rev. Dr. Allan. From Virginia came young Hedges; and from Missouri, Andrew, of the famous family of Benton. From the South came another, James Bradley, a Negro who had bought his freedom from slavery with the earnings of his own hands. Most of these students were mature; only eleven were less than twenty-one years old; twelve of them had been agents for the national benevolent societies, and six were married men with families. The theological class was the largest that had ever gathered in America, and its members were deeply conscious of their importance.

Lane ended up with about 100 students, the most of any seminary in America.

One of Weld's key contentions (and of Puritan abolition sentiment in general) was that slavery was inherently anti-family. While slave marriage was illegal, it happened frequently. Slave owners expected their slaves to have many children to replace their numbers; Virginia and Maryland "exported" slaves to the Deep South—they were an asset like cattle—after Congress had banned the importation of slaves in 1808. Since slaves were property they were frequently bought and sold, ripping apart families. In his 1839 book American Slavery as It Is, Weld showed just how brutal the slave trade was towards families. To the very family-focused Puritans, this was one of the greatest crimes of slavery. Weld's descriptions of families destroyed would later serve as the basis for scenes in Uncle Tom's Cabin, including Uncle Tom's being sold and separated from the children.

===== Lane Seminary debates =====
No sooner had this disparate group of former Oneida students and others arrived at Lane, under the leadership of Weld, than they formed an anti-slavery society. They then proceeded to hold a well-publicized series of debates on abolition versus African colonization, lasting 18 evenings, and decided that abolition was a much better solution to slavery. In fact no real debate took place, since no one appeared to defend colonization.

These "debates", which were well publicized, alarmed Lane's president Lyman Beecher and the school's trustees. Adding to their alarm were the classes the students were holding in the Black community, teaching Blacks to read. Fearing violence, since Cincinnati was strongly anti-abolitionist (see Cincinnati riots of 1829), they immediately prohibited any future such "off-the-topic" discussions and activities. The students, again led by Weld, felt that abolitionism was so important – it was their responsibility as Christians to promote it – and they resigned en masse, joined by Asa Mahan, a trustee who supported the students. With support from the Tappans, they briefly tried to establish a new seminary, but as this did not prove a practical solution they accepted a proposal that they move as a group to the new Oberlin Collegiate Institute.

==== Oberlin Collegiate Institute ====
Due to its students' anti-slavery position, Oberlin soon became one of the most liberal colleges and accepted African-American students. Along with Garrison, Northcutt and Collins were proponents of immediate abolition. Abby Kelley Foster became an "ultra abolitionist" and a follower of William Lloyd Garrison. She led Susan B. Anthony as well as Elizabeth Cady Stanton into the anti-slavery cause.

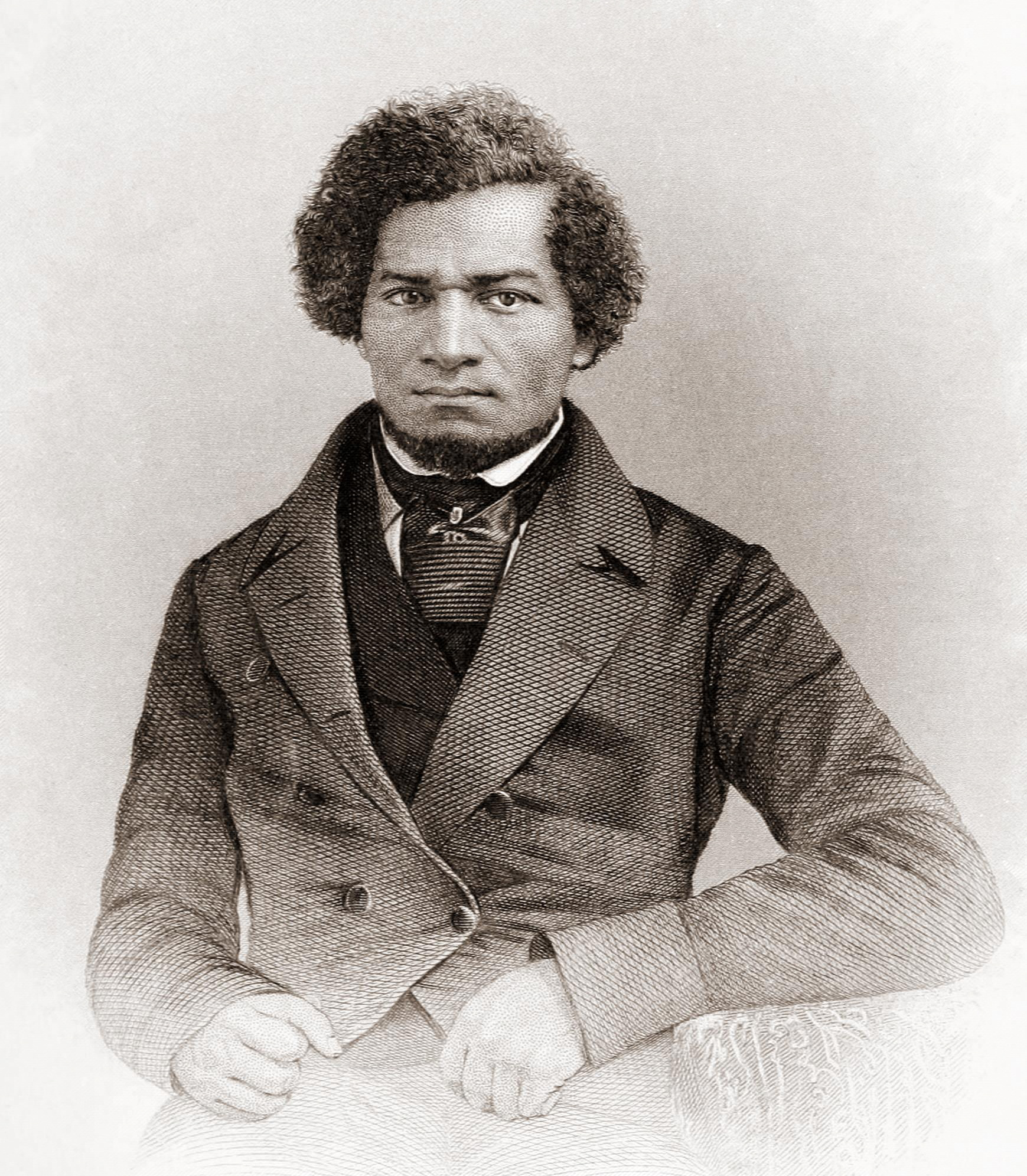
Frederick Douglass (1818–1895), a former slave whose memoirs, Narrative of the Life of Frederick Douglass, an American Slave (1845) and My Bondage and My Freedom (1855), became bestsellers, which aided the cause of abolition

After 1840, "abolition" usually referred to positions similar to Garrison's. It was largely an ideological movement led by about 3,000 people, including free blacks and free people of color, many of whom, such as Frederick Douglass in Rochester, New York, and Robert Purvis and James Forten in Philadelphia, played prominent leadership roles. Douglass became legally free during a two-year stay in England, as British supporters raised funds to purchase his freedom from his American owner Thomas Auld, and also helped fund his abolitionist newspapers in the United States. Abolitionism had a strong religious base including Quakers, and people converted by the revivalist fervor of the Second Great Awakening, led by Charles Finney in the North, in the 1830s. Belief in abolition contributed to the formation of Christian denominations, such as the Free Methodist Church.

Evangelical abolitionists founded some colleges, most notably Bates College in Maine and Oberlin College in Ohio. The movement attracted such figures as Yale president Noah Porter and Harvard president Thomas Hill.

=== Transatlantic abolitionist movement ===
In the mid-nineteenth century, American abolitionism was shaped by British ideological and organisational influences. A key part of this exchange was the intersection of abolitionism and free trade ideology. British reformers such as Richard Cobden and the Anti Corn Law League inspired American abolitionists to promote free trade arguing that it was morally and economically aligned to abolition in the United States. Leaders like Joshua Leavitt, campaigner for the Liberty Party, argued that repealing British tariffs would reduce US reliance on Southern slave grown cotton and open markets to free labour goods from the North. Another prominent British activist was George Thompson, who toured the US several times where he delivered speeches connecting Free Trade to the American abolition cause. Figures like Cobden and Thompson were a direct influence on the ideology of Lloyd Garrison.

Another movement called the Free-produce movement extended across the Atlantic. This movement aimed to boycott goods produced by enslaved Africans. The movement was connected to British activist Joseph Sturge and the idea that a free market allowed for consumer morality.

Sociologist Cecilia Walsh-Russo developed the term 'mutual brokerage' to refer to the interchange of ideas within UK-US abolitionist movements. She refers to the interactions which allowed ideas and political strategy to co-develop, rather than suggesting one learned from the other. Walsh-Russo cites the 1840 World Anti-Slavery Convention in London as an example of mutual brokerage. She claims the exclusion of women as delegates, despite their presence at the events forced transatlantic abolitionist to re-assess their understanding of political participation and democracy, often leading to more progressive views in UK and US activism. Despite exclusion from the conference women asserted their right to participate in the abolitionist cause by using informal setting such as salons to promote abolition.

==== Abolitionism and Ireland ====
William Lloyd Garrison also engaged in Irish politics. He communicated with key figures like Daniel O'Connell, which shaped his understanding of abolition as 'universal emancipation'. O'Connell was outspoken in his opposition to slavery and was Frequently quoted in The Liberator because Garrison O'Connell as a model activist, both embracing 'agitation' as a non-violent but forceful political strategy, and emphasising the power of public speech and print in mobilising mass opinion.

Garrisonian abolitionists also used Ireland and the Irish as tools of comparison especially in combatting the American Colonization Society. The Liberator frequently juxtaposed the situation of free black Americans with that of Irish immigrants, arguing that while Irish immigrants are welcomed into American society despite being stereotyped as ignorant and degraded, because of the colonial suffering, black Americans were pushed out through colonisation projects.

However, efforts to forge direct relations between Irish Americans and African Americans largely failed. The 1842 Address from the People of Ireland to Their Countrymen and Countrywomen in America, written by Irish abolitionists and signed by O'Connell, urged Irish Americans to support abolition and racial equality. Garrisonians hoped this would foster diasporic responsibility among the Irish but it was rejected by most. Irish immigrants, perhaps due to a desire to assimilate in the US, were overall not supportive of the abolitionist cause.

== Anti-abolitionism ==
=== Anti-abolitionism in the North ===
It is easy to overstate the support for abolitionism in the North. "From Maine to Missouri, from the Atlantic to the Gulf, crowds gathered to hear mayors and aldermen, bankers and lawyers, ministers and priests denounce the abolitionists as amalgamationists, dupes, fanatics, foreign agents, and incendiaries." The whole abolitionist movement, the cadre of anti-slavery lecturers, was primarily focused on the North: convincing Northerners that slavery should be immediately abolished, and freed slaves given rights.

A majority of white Southerners, though by no means all, supported slavery; there was a growing feeling in favor of emancipation in North Carolina, Maryland, Virginia, and Kentucky, until the panic resulting from Nat Turner's 1831 revolt put an end to it. But only a minority in the North supported abolition, seen as an extreme, "radical" measure. (See Radical Republicans.) Horace Greeley remarked in 1854 that he had "never been able to discover any strong, pervading, over-ruling Anti Slavery sentiment in the Free States." Free blacks were subject in the North as well as in the South to conditions almost inconceivable today (2019). Although the picture is neither uniform nor static, in general free blacks in the North were not citizens and could neither vote nor hold public office. They could not give testimony in court and their word was never taken against a white man's word, as a result of which white crimes against blacks were rarely punished. Black children could not study in the public schools, even though Black taxpayers helped support them, and there were only a handful of schools for Black students, like the African Free School in New York, the Abiel Smith School in Boston, and the Watkins Academy for Negro Youth in Baltimore. When schools for negroes were set up in Ohio in the 1830s, the teacher of one slept in it every night "for fear whites would burn it", and at another, "a vigilance committee threatened to tar and feather [the teacher] and ride her on a rail if she did not leave". "Black education was a dangerous pursuit for teachers."

Most colleges would not admit blacks. (Oberlin Collegiate Institute was the first college that survived to admit them by policy; the Oneida Institute was a short-lived predecessor.) In wages, housing, access to services, and transportation, separate but equal or Jim Crow treatment would have been a great improvement. The proposal to create the country's first college for negros, in New Haven, Connecticut, got such strong local opposition (New Haven Excitement) that it was quickly abandoned. Schools in which blacks and whites studied together in Canaan, New Hampshire, and Canterbury, Connecticut, were physically destroyed by mobs.

Southern actions against white abolitionists took legal channels: Amos Dresser was tried, convicted, and publicly whipped in Knoxville, and Reuben Crandall, Prudence Crandall's younger brother, was arrested in Washington D.C., and was found innocent, although he died soon of tuberculosis he contracted in jail. (The prosecutor was Francis Scott Key.) In Savannah, Georgia, the mayor and alderman protected an abolitionist visitor from a mob.

==== Violence against abolitionists ====
In the North there was far more serious violence by mobs, what the press sometimes called "mobocracy". In 1837 Rev. Elijah P. Lovejoy, who published an abolitionist newspaper, was killed by a mob in Illinois. Only six months later, the large, modern, and expensive new hall which the Pennsylvania Anti-Slavery Society built in Philadelphia in 1838, was burned by a mob three days after it opened. There were other anti-abolitionist riots in New York (1834), Cincinnati (1829, 1836, and 1841), Norwich, Connecticut (1834), Washington, D.C. (1835), Philadelphia (1842), and Granville, Ohio (following the Ohio State Anti-Slavery Convention, 1836), although there was also a pro-abolition riot (more precisely a pro-fugitive slave riot) in Boston in 1836 (and see Jerry Rescue). Between 1835 and 1838, anti-abolitionist violence "settled into a routine feature of public life in virtually all the major northern cities".

Giving to blacks the same rights that whites had, as Garrison called for, was "far outside the mainstream of opinion in the 1830s." Some opposed even allowing blacks to join abolitionist organizations. The one time that Garrison defended Southern slave-owners was when he compared them with anti-abolitionist Northerners:

I found [in the North] contempt more bitter, opposition more active, detraction more relentless, prejudice more stubborn, and apathy more frozen, than among slave owners themselves.

Alexis de Tocqueville, in Democracy in America said:

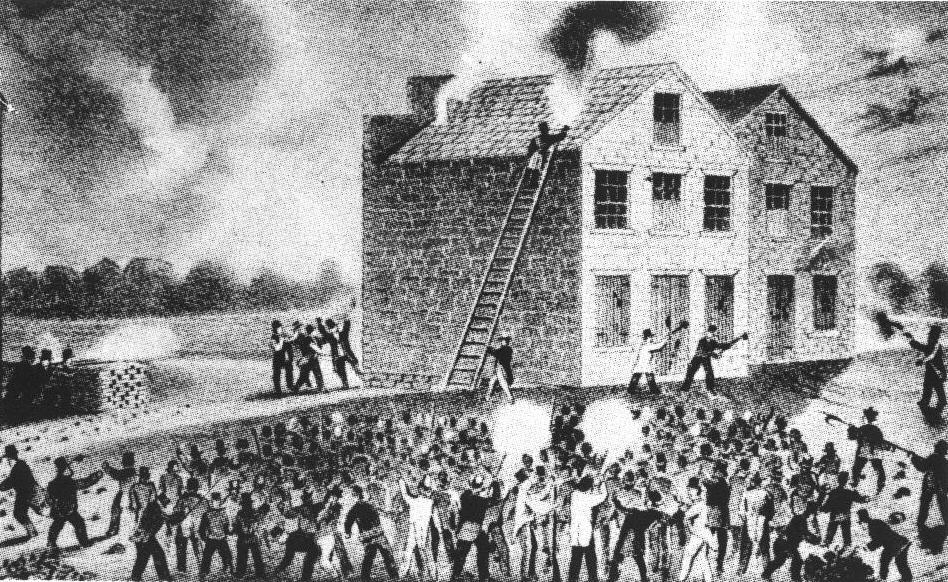
An illustration of the proslavery riot in Alton, Illinois on 7 November 1837, which resulted in the murder of abolitionist Elijah Parish Lovejoy

Abolitionists nationwide were outraged by the murder of white abolitionist and journalist Elijah Parish Lovejoy by a proslavery mob in Alton, Illinois on 7 November 1837. Six months later, Pennsylvania Hall, an abolitionist venue in Philadelphia, was burnt to the ground by another proslavery mob on May 17, 1838. Both events contributed to the growing American debate over slavery and marked an increase in violence against abolitionists in the United States.

Amos Dresser, a participant in the Lane Debates, was publicly whipped in Nashville. A gallows with a note from "Judge Lynch" was erected in front of Garrison's office. He, along with the Tappans, was hung in effigy in Charleston, S.C. Southern post offices burned rather than delivered abolitionist publications, in which they were supported by the national Post Office. President Andrew Jackson called the abolitionists' tracts "unconstitutional and wicked."

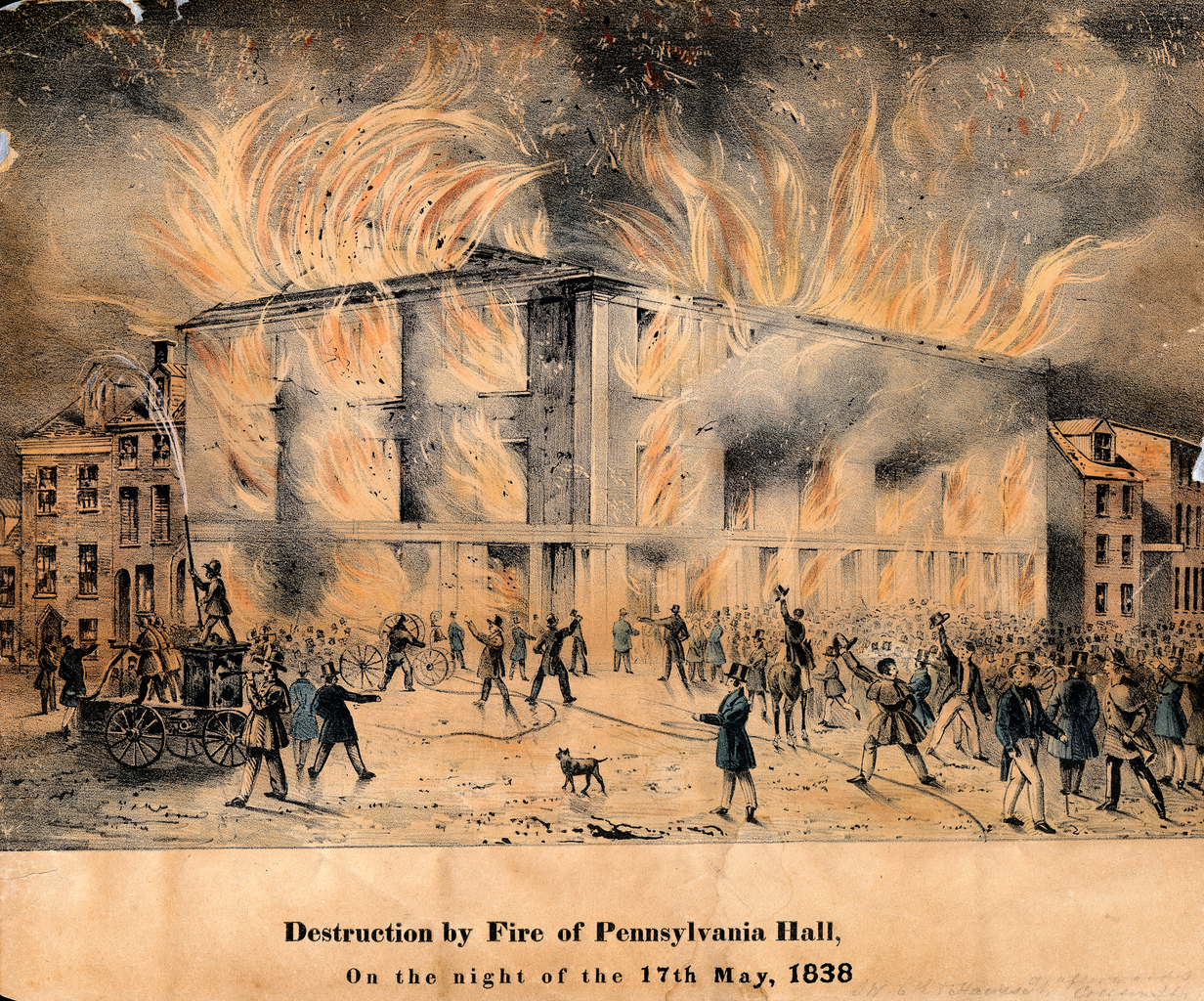
Burning of Pennsylvania Hall, home of the Pennsylvania Anti-Slavery Society. Print by John Caspar Wild. Note firemen spraying water on adjacent building.

The prejudice of race appears to be stronger in the States which have abolished slavery, than in those where it still exists; and nowhere is it so intolerant as In those States where servitude has never been known.

Similarly, Harriet Beecher Stowe stated that "The bitterness of Southern slaveholders was tempered by many considerations of kindness for servants born in their houses, or upon their estates; but the Northern slaveholder traded in men and women whom he never saw, and of whose separations, tears, and miseries he determined never to hear."

=== The pro-slavery reaction to abolitionism ===
Slave owners were angry over the attacks on what some Southerners (including the politician John C. Calhoun) referred to as their "peculiar institution" of slavery. Starting in the 1830s, Southerners developed a vehement and growing ideological defense of slavery. Slave owners claimed that slavery was not a necessary evil, or an evil of any sort; slavery was a positive good for masters and slaves alike, and it was explicitly sanctioned by God. Biblical arguments were made in defense of slavery by religious leaders such as the Rev. Fred A. Ross and political leaders such as Jefferson Davis. Southern Biblical interpretations contradicted those of the abolitionists; a popular one was that the curse on Noah's son Ham and his descendants in Africa justified enslaving blacks. Abolitionists responded, denying that either God or the Bible endorses slavery, at least as practiced in the Antebellum South.

=== Colonization and the founding of Liberia ===
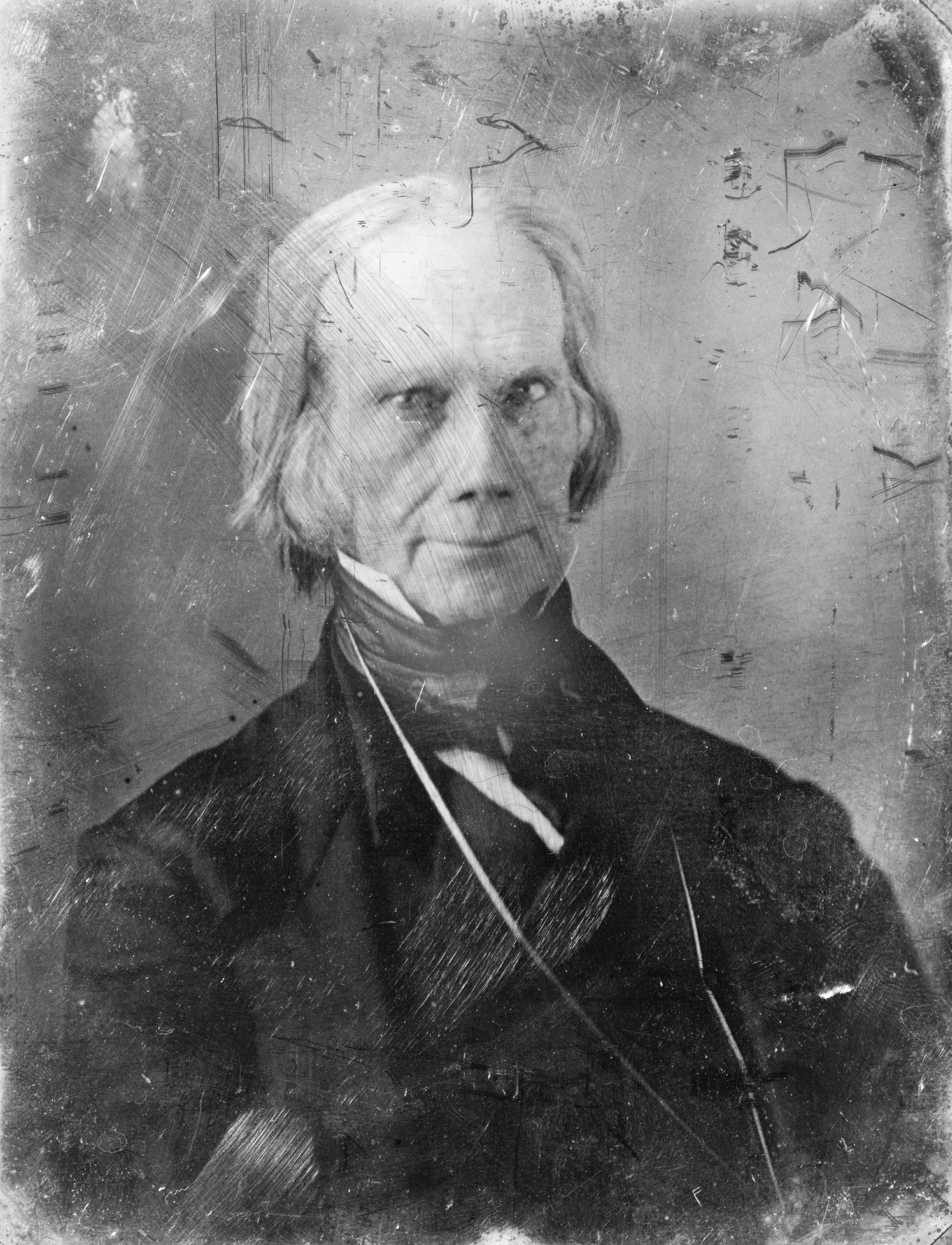
Henry Clay (1777–1852), one of the three founders of the American Colonization Society

In the early 19th century, a variety of organizations were established that advocated relocation of black people from the United States, most prominently the American Colonization Society (ACS), founded in 1816. The ACS enjoyed the support of prominent Southern leaders such as Henry Clay and James Monroe, who saw it as a convenient means of relocating free blacks, whom they perceived as a threat to their control over enslaved blacks. Starting in the 1820s, the ACS and affiliated state societies assisted a few thousand free blacks to move to the newly established colonies in West Africa that were to form the Republic of Liberia. From 1832 onward most of the migrants were enslaved people who had been freed on the condition that they go to Liberia. Many migrants died of local diseases, but enough survived for Liberia to declare independence in 1847. The Americo-Liberians formed a ruling elite whose treatment of the native population followed the lines of disdain for African culture they had acquired in America.

Most African Americans opposed colonization, and simply wanted to be given the rights of free citizens in the United States. One notable opponent of such plans was the wealthy free black abolitionist James Forten of Philadelphia.

In 1832, prominent white abolitionist William Lloyd Garrison published his book Thoughts on African Colonization, in which he attacked severely the policy of sending blacks to (not "back to") Africa, and specifically the American Colonization Society. The Colonization Society, which he had previously supported, is "a creature without heart, without brains, eyeless, unnatural, hypocritical, relentless and unjust." "Colonization", according to Garrison, was not a plan to eliminate slavery, but to protect it. As it was put by a Garrison supporter:

It is no object of the Colonization Society to ameliorate the condition of the slave.... The thing is, to get them out of the way; the welfare of the negro is not consulted at all.

Garrison also pointed out that a majority of the colonists died of disease, and the number of free blacks actually resettled in the future Liberia was minute in comparison to the number of slaves in the United States. As put by the same supporter:

As a remedy for slavery, it must be placed amongst the grossest of all delusions. In fifteen years it has transported less than three thousand persons to the African coast; while the increase on their numbers, in the same period, is about seven hundred thousand!"

== See also ==
- Abolitionism in Boston, Massachusetts
- Abolitionism in Brazil
- Abolitionism in France
- Abolitionism in New Bedford, Massachusetts
- Abolitionism in the United Kingdom
- Abraham Lincoln and slavery
- African American founding fathers of the United States
- Compensated emancipation
- George Washington and slavery
- History of slavery
  - History of slavery in the United States
- James Redpath
- John Quincy Adams and abolitionism
- List of opponents of slavery
- Slavery among Native Americans in the United States
- Slavery in the colonial United States
- Thomas Jefferson and slavery
- Timeline of abolition of slavery and serfdom
- Treatment of the enslaved in the United States

== General and cited references ==
- Morin, Isobel V. (1994). Women Who Reformed Politics. Oliver Press. pp. 13–27. ISBN 978-1-881508-16-8.
- Sterling, Dorothy (1991). Ahead of Her Time: Abbey Kelly and The Politics of Antislavery. W.W. Norton and Company. ISBN 0-393-03026-1.
