= Theodore S. Wright =

American abolitionist and minister (1797–1847)

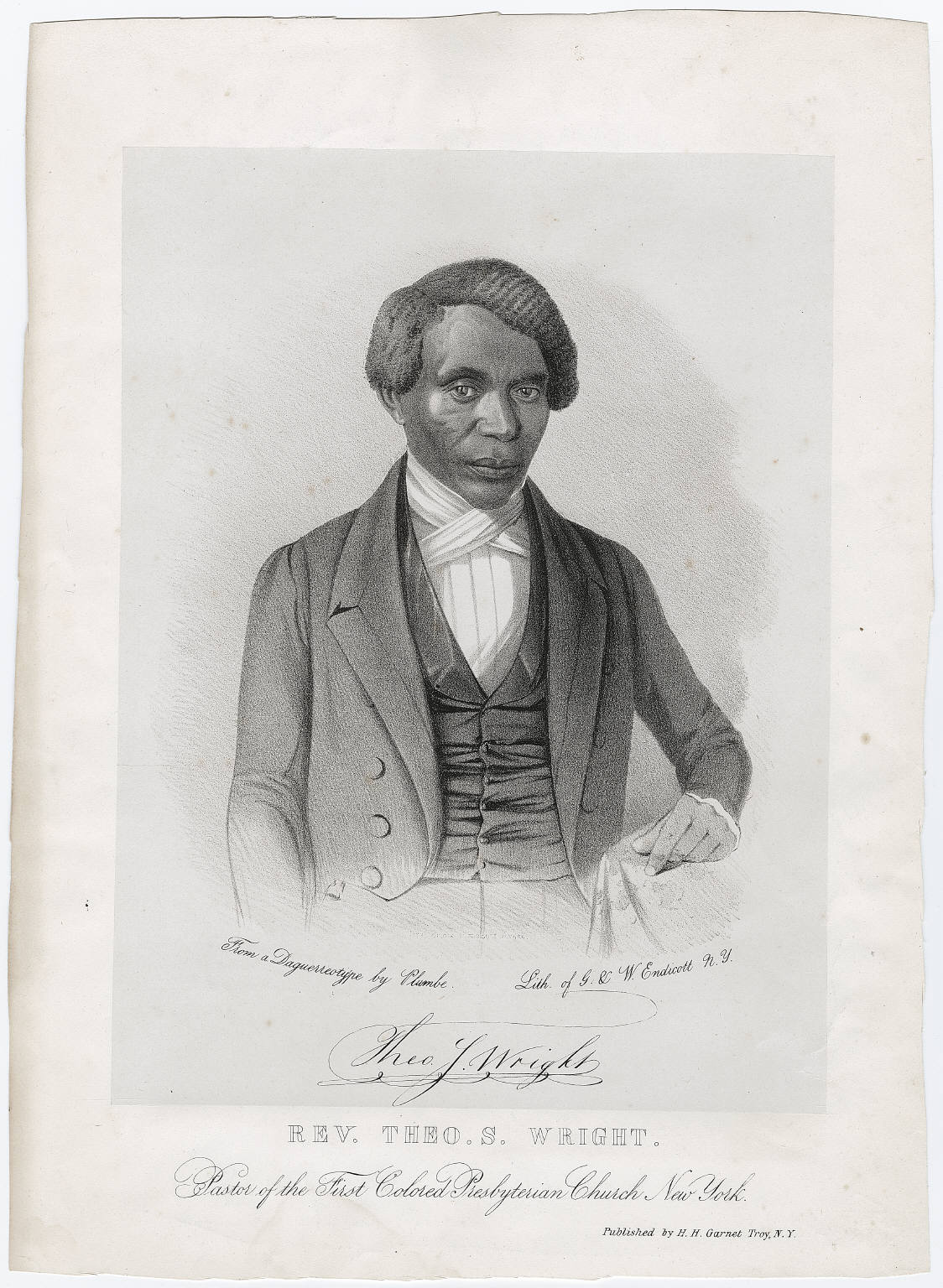
- Born: 1797; Providence, Rhode Island, US
- Died: March 25, 1847 (aged 49–50); New York City, US
- Burial place: Vale Cemetery and Vale Park
- Education: Princeton Theological Seminary
- Occupations: Minister, antislavery activist

Theodore Sedgwick Wright (April 1797 – March 25, 1847), sometimes Theodore Sedgewick Wright, was an African American abolitionist and minister who was active in New York City, where he led the First Colored Presbyterian Church as its second pastor. He was the first African American to attend Princeton Theological Seminary (and the second to graduate from any US seminary), from which he graduated in 1828.

In 1833, Wright became a founding member of the American Anti-Slavery Society, an influential interracial association of abolitionists, and served on its executive committee until 1840. He also was a founding member of the American and Foreign Anti-Slavery Society, the Union Missionary Society, and the American Missionary Association.

== Early life and education ==
Theodore Sedgwick Wright was born in April 1797 to free parents in Providence, Rhode Island. He was named in honor of lawyer and politician Theodore Sedgwick. As a child, Wright moved with his family to Schenectady, New York. He attended the African Free School in New York City and flourished under the mentorship of Samuel Cornish. His father, Richard P. G. Wright, was a barber and an antislavery activist who served as a delegate at the 1817 Black convention in Philadelphia that opposed the mission of the American Colonization Society to persuade free Blacks to expatriate to Liberia.

With the aid of Governor DeWitt Clinton and Arthur Tappan of the New York Manumission Society, Wright became the first person of color admitted to the Princeton Theological Seminary. He described his time at the seminary as a "dark and gloomy period" for race relations, in which the white faculty and students were united behind the American Colonization Society's efforts to remove free Blacks to Liberia. When John Brown Russwurm in Freedom's Journal spurned Wright's professor Archibald Alexander's support of colonization, Wright said the "united views and intentions of the people of color were made known, and the nation awoke as from slumber." Wright helped distribute Freedom's Journal while at Princeton. In 1828, he became the first African American to graduate from Princeton Theological Seminary, and one of the first to complete theological studies at any seminary in the United States.

== Ministry ==
In September 1828, Wright was called as minister of New York's First Colored Presbyterian Church, later the Shiloh Presbyterian Church (its successor congregation is St. James Presbyterian Church in Harlem). A licentiate minister at the time, he was ordained in early 1829, succeeding the church's founder, Samuel Cornish. He served as pastor of this church until his death, when he was succeeded by his friend Henry Highland Garnet. During his ministry, he grew the congregation from 50 to 413 members.

Wright was active in the Presbyterian Church broadly. In the 1840s, he became moderator of the Third Presbytery of New York, and pursued an antislavery agenda in the Synod of New York and New Jersey despite bitter opposition from proslavery interests. He also served on the executive committee of the Evangelical Alliance, a transatlantic Presbyterian group deeply divided over slavery.

== Activism ==
In 1833 Wright was a founding member of the American Anti-Slavery Society, which had an interracial membership and leadership. He served on the executive committee until 1840. That year he left with other moderate members, including Arthur and Lewis Tappan, and helped found the American and Foreign Anti-Slavery Society. They disagreed with some of William Lloyd Garrison's proposals, including his insistence on having women in leadership positions and his rejection of the US Constitution as a corrupt document.

On September 27, 1836, while attending a Princeton commencement ceremony, Wright was subjected to a racist assault by a white student, Thomas Ancrum, son of a South Carolina planter. Wright refused to fight back, staying true to his principles of nonviolence. At a national Colored Convention in 1837, he opposed a resolution advocating Black self-defense, which he deemed "un-Christian."

Wright supported activities of other black communities in New York. In 1837 he spoke at the dedication of the First Free Church of Schenectady, the first black church in the city, and praised its founding a school for its children. He was a founding member and vice president of the Phoenix Society and was instrumental in establishing the Phoenix High School for Black students.

For years Wright acted as a conductor for the Underground Railroad in New York City and used his house at 235 W. Broadway as a station. He served on the executive committee of the New York Committee of Vigilance, established to try to help fugitive slaves evade slave catchers and resist their being returned to the South.

At the 1843 National Convention of Colored Citizens in Buffalo, Wright initially supported Garnet's call for enslaved people to rise up against their oppressor. Frederick Douglass spoke against Garnet's resolution, which convention members narrowly voted down.

== Personal life ==
Wright was married twice. His first wife (name unrecorded) died, allegedly of exposure, while the couple traveled by steamboat between New York and Boston one winter. On May 29, 1837, Wright married Adaline T. Turpin, a prosperous widow from New Rochelle, New York. They had two children, neither of whom survived their infancy, and Adaline died on April 24, 1839.

On March 25, 1847, Wright died in New York City. He was buried in the African American burying ground at Vale Cemetery in Schenectady, New York, where his father still lived.

== Legacy ==
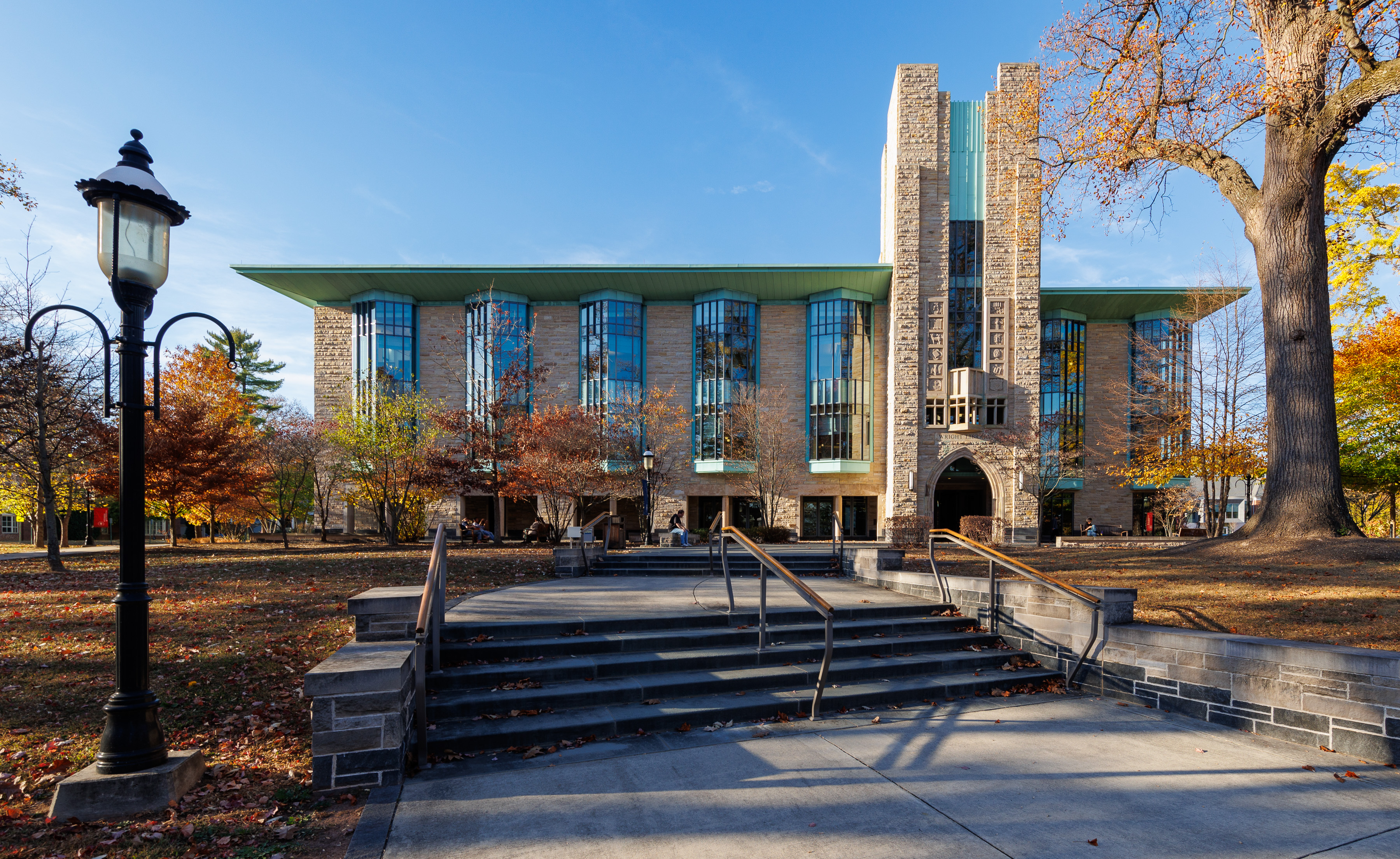
The Wright Library at Princeton Theological Seminary

The only book-length work on Wright is the 2005 Princeton Theological Seminary master's thesis by Daniel Paul Morrison. Entitled Theodore Sedgwick Wright (1794–1847): Early Princeton Theological Seminary Abolitionist, the thesis reconstructs the biography of the man and offers insight into Wright struggle with the faculty of Princeton Seminary and the American Colonization Society which all of the faculty supported. Morrison's work was cited in James H. Moorhead's 2012 book Princeton Theological Seminary in American Religion and Culture.

In October 2021, as part of a "multi-year action plan to repent for [its] historical ties to slavery," Princeton Theological Seminary renamed its library the Theodore Sedgwick Wright Library.
