= Cassey House =

Historic house in Philadelphia, Pennsylvania, US

Coordinates: 39.9439°N 75.1467°W

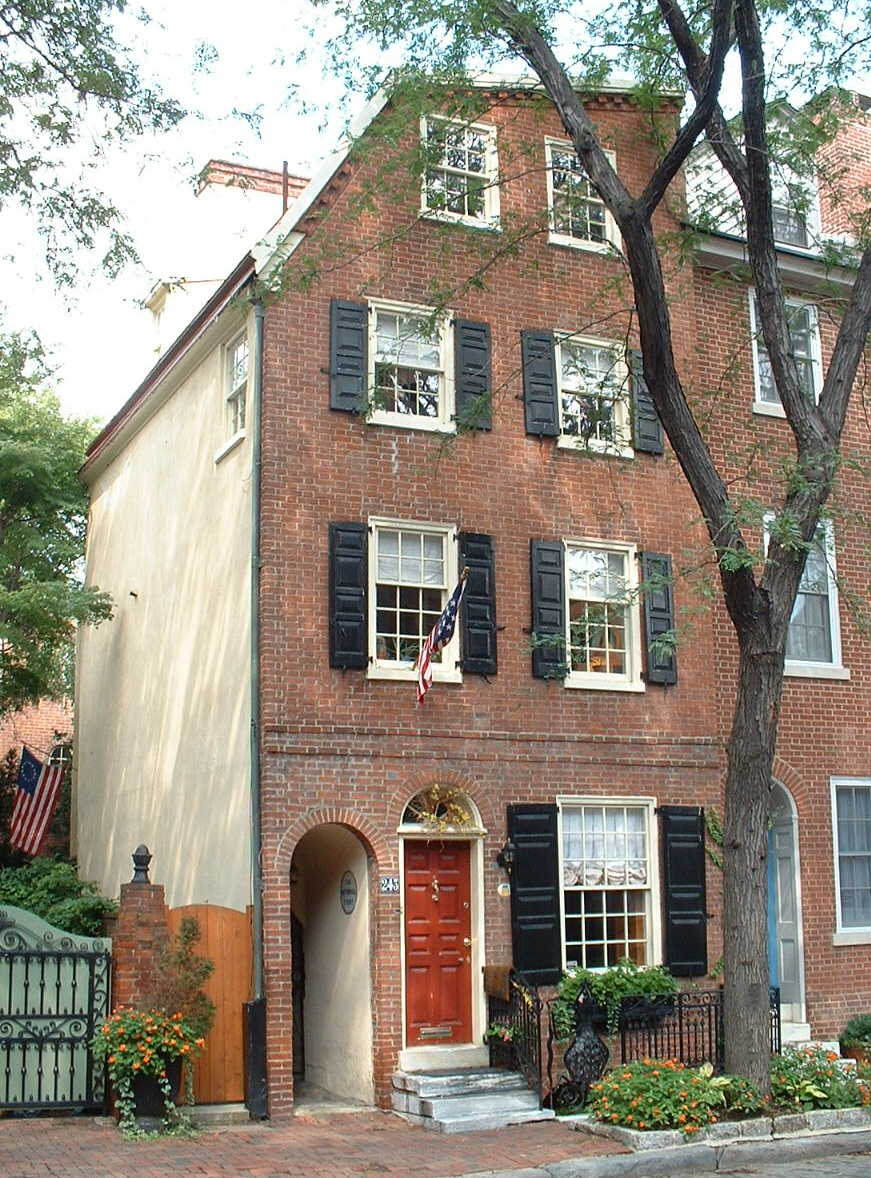
The Cassey House in Philadelphia, Pennsylvania

The Cassey House is a historic house associated with the Cassey family, located at 243 Delancey Street in the Society Hill neighborhood of Philadelphia, Pennsylvania. It was owned by the Cassey family for 84 years (from 1845 until 1929), they were a prominent African-American family known for their philanthropy and work for the abolition of slavery, and their support for local educational, intellectual, and benevolent organizations.

== Description ==
The Cassey House is located at 243 Delancey Street (formerly at 63 Union Street), at the corner of S. Philip Street in the Society Hill neighborhood of Philadelphia, Pennsylvania. It is a four-story brick building.

== The Cassey family ==
Joseph Cassey (1789–1848) had arrived in Philadelphia from the French West Indies some time before 1808. He prospered in the barber trade and as a wig-maker, perfumer, and money-lender. Cassey was also active as an abolitionist. His wife was Amy Matilda Williams (1809–1875), from a prominent African American family in New York City, her father was a leading Methodist Episcopalian minister, Rev. Peter H. Williams Jr.

Joseph Cassey's barber shop advertisement, 1832

Cassey bought and sold real estate and worked as a landlord. His real estate business partner was Robert Purvis. In the 1820s and 1830s, Cassey worked extensively in community service, particularly focused on African American education. He was a member at St. Thomas’ Church on 5th Street. He retired and moved from his residence over his barber shop at 36 South Fourth Street to more elegant accommodations at 113 Lombard Street, not far from his friend James Forten who was living at 92 Lombard Street (these addresses are from the former street numbering system).

Six of their eight children survived infancy. In 1846, Amy adopted Annie Wood, the 15-year-old aunt of 9-year-old Charlotte Forten Grimke. When Joseph Cassey died in 1848, Amy remarried two years later to Charles Lenox Remond and moved to Salem, Massachusetts, where she continued her work in abolition and civil rights. Both Annie Wood and Charlotte Forten lived with the Remonds while attending school in Salem; they regarded Amy's daughter, Sarah Cassey, as their sister. The days and hours leading to Amy's death in 1856 are captured in the diary of young Charlotte Forten. In 1861, Sarah Cassey married Detroit and Chatham doctor, Samuel C. Watson. She would die in 1875.

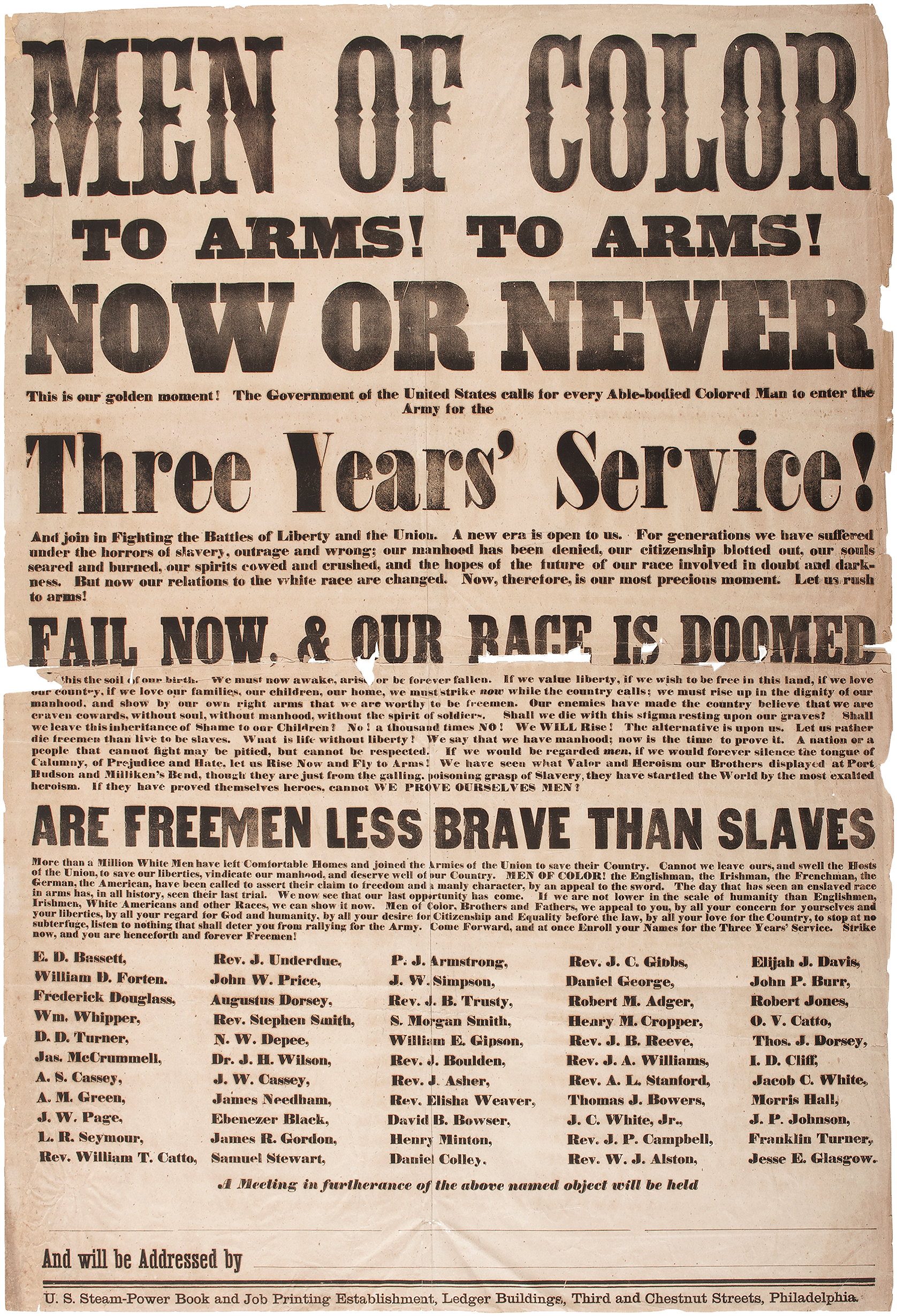
Men of Color Civil War Recruitment Broadside (1863), written by Frederick Douglass, listed Alfred Cassey as a speaker

Son Rev. Peter William Cassey (1831–1917) was a barber, dentist, and bleeder in Philadelphia, later moving to California. Initially a successful barber with a shaving saloon in San Francisco, he relocated to San Jose in 1860, where he founded the Phoenixonian Institute (1861), the first secondary school in California for Black students, and founded the "Christ's Church" in San Francisco. Peter helped organize the California State Convention of Colored Citizens in Sacramento in 1865. In 1881, Rev. Cassey left San Jose to become the first African American clergy at St. Cyprian's Church in New Bern, North Carolina.

Son Alfred S. Cassey (1829–1903) continued his father's legacy for being foremost in the ranks of the African-American elite of the day. A postal worker and performing musician, although his early trade was as a gilder, carver, and painter of ornamental work, Alfred was the first Chair of the American Negro Historical Society in 1897 and lived with his family in this house. He was active in the boycott campaign to end discrimination of black troops in 1864.

Son Joseph C. Cassey was principal bookkeeper to Stephen Smith and William Whipper, lumber merchants in Columbia, Pennsylvania, and notable African-Americans in Philadelphia. Joseph C. was credited with being one of the best accountants and businessmen in the U.S. in his era. He went on to own and run the leading lumber business in the Penn Yan area of western New York.

Granddaughter Matilda Inez Cassey (1851–1916) was a pianist, performing concerts in Philadelphia, and lived her whole life in the Cassey House.

== Deed records for the Cassey House ==
As for the Cassey holdings at 243 Delancey Street, formerly listed as 63 Union Street, according to deed records. Joseph bought the back portion of the property in 1845. As no building was described in this deed, the stand-alone trinity style house probably was constructed under the patronage of Joseph Cassey.

In 1866, the whole of 243 Delancey Street, with all buildings, including the main house and now three trinities, was bought by Francis L. Cassey at a sheriff's sale. Francis transferred the property to Alfred's wife, Abby A. Cassey, in 1871. Alfred S. and Abby Cassey were recorded to have lived there at least from 1867 to 1903 per Philadelphia City Directory records.

Abby willed the property to Matilda Inez Cassey. The estate of Matilda, who likely lived her whole life in the main house, sold the property in 1917. The final Cassey interest in the property, one trinity, was sold by James G. A. Cassey in 1929. Copies of these deeds can be found at the Philadelphia City Archives and at the Blockson Collection, Temple University in the Cassey file.
