= Phoenix Society (New York) =

The Phoenix Society, was a mutual aid society for African Americans and education, "an organization dedicated to 'morals, literature and the mechanical arts'". It was founded in 1833 by Samuel Cornish, Theodore S. Wright, Peter Williams Jr., and Christopher Rush in New York City. They had support from the philanthropist brothers Arthur and Lewis Tappan. Many people associated with the Phoenix Society attended the New York Manumission Society’s African Free School in New York City.

They set up the Phoenix High School for Colored Youth, first for boys, where Henry Highland Garnet studied, followed quickly by a high school for girls.

== See also ==
- Phoenixonian Institute, first African American secondary school in California founded by William's grandson
