= Charles Lenox Remond =

American orator, activist and abolitionist (1810–1873)

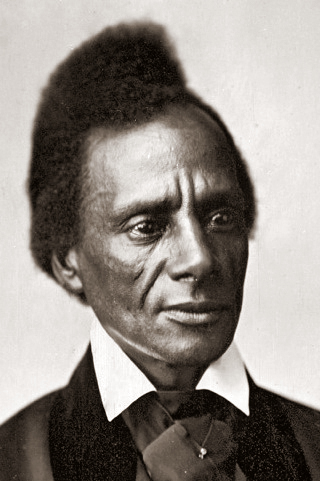
- Born: February 1, 1810; Salem, Massachusetts, U.S.
- Died: December 22, 1873 (aged 63); Boston, Massachusetts, U.S.
- Occupations: Activist, lecturer
- Spouse(s): Amy Matilda William Cassey; Elizabeth Magee
- Children: Amy Matilda Remond, Charles Lenox Remond, Jr., Wendell Phillips Remond, Albert Ernest Remond, Peter William Cassey (stepson)
- Parents: John Remond (father); Nancy Lenox (mother)
- Relatives: Sarah Parker Remond (sister); Caroline Remond Putnam (sister); Cecilia Remond Putnam (sister); Marchita Remond (sister)

Charles Lenox Remond (February 1, 1810 – December 22, 1873) was an American orator, activist and abolitionist based in Massachusetts. He lectured against slavery across the Northeast, and in 1840 traveled to the British Isles on a tour with William Lloyd Garrison. During the American Civil War, he recruited blacks for the United States Colored Troops, helping staff the first two units sent from Massachusetts. From a large family of African-American entrepreneurs, he was the brother of Sarah Parker Remond, also a lecturer against slavery.

== Biography ==
=== Early years ===
Remond was born in Salem, Massachusetts to John Remond, a free man of color from the island of Curaçao, who was a hairdresser, and Nancy Lenox, daughter of a prominent Bostonian, a hairdresser and caterer. Massachusetts had effectively abolished slavery after the Revolution with its new constitution. The eldest son of eight children, Charles Remond began his activism in opposition to southern slavery early. His siblings included sisters Nancy, Cecilia, Maritchie Juan, Caroline, and Sarah Parker, and a younger brother John Remond.

While in his twenties, Remond started speaking for abolition at public gatherings and conferences in Massachusetts, Rhode Island, Maine, New York and Pennsylvania.

=== Activism ===
In 1838, the Massachusetts Anti-Slavery Society chose him as one of its agents. As a delegate from the American Anti-Slavery Society, in 1840 he traveled with William Lloyd Garrison, a leading American abolitionist, to the World's Anti-Slavery Convention in London. The young Remond gained a reputation as an eloquent lecturer and is reported to have been the first black public speaker on abolition. He was described as expressing himself with "militancy" and wit.

Remond proposed resolution at the first national Colored Convention in Philadelphia, PA (1830) calling for blacks to leave "en masse" any church "that discriminated against them in seating or at the communion table." Their resolution was adopted.

In 1840, when female delegates were denied seats at the World Anti-Slavery Convention in London, Lenox and Garrison protested and walked out with the women.

In 1857 at a meeting held in New Brighton by Remond and his sister Sarah, also an abolitionist lecturer, Remond said, "When the world shall learn that 'mind makes the man'-- that goodness; moral worth, and integrity of soul, are the true tests of Character, then prejudice against caste and color, will cease to be."

During the Civil War, Remond recruited black soldiers in Massachusetts for the United States Colored Troops of the Union Army, helping man the early, famed units of the 54th Massachusetts Infantry.

=== Work ===
Remond's family owned and operated a successful hairdressing business, and catering service in which several members participated. His three sisters, Cecilia, Maritchie, and Caroline, owned a women's hair salon and the largest wig factory in the state.

Remond eventually struck out on his own. After the Civil War ended, he moved to Boston, where he worked as a clerk in the United States Customs House. He also worked as a street lamp inspector. He later purchased a farm in South Reading (now Wakefield), Massachusetts.

== Marriage and family ==
Remond was married in September 1850 to Amy Matilda Cassey (née Williams), the daughter of Rev. Peter Williams, Jr. She was the widow of wealthy Philadelphia barber Joseph Cassey, with whom she had eight children including Peter William Cassey and an adopted daughter, Annie E. Wood, the maternal aunt of Charlotte Forten Grimke. After her marriage to Remond, she moved to Salem, where she lived until her death on August 15, 1856.

Two years later, Remond married again, to Elizabeth Magee, a native of Virginia, in Newton on July 5, 1858. The abolitionist preacher, Rev. Theodore Parker, officiated. Before her death in 1871, Elizabeth and Remond had four children: Amy Matilda (1859–72), Charles Lenox, Jr. (1860–82), Wendell Phillips (1863–66), and Albert Ernest Remond (1866–1903).

Remond died in Boston in December 1873. He is buried in Harmony Grove Cemetery, in Salem.

Frederick Douglass named one of his own sons, Charles Remond Douglass, after him.
