= 1834 New York anti-abolitionist riots =

Pro-slavery riots in New York City

Beginning on July 7, 1834, New York City was torn by a huge anti-abolitionist riot (also called Farren Riot or Tappan Riot) that lasted for nearly a week until it was put down by military force. "At times the rioters controlled whole sections of the city while they attacked the homes, businesses, and churches of abolitionist leaders and ransacked black neighborhoods."

== Before the riots ==
Their deeper origins lay in the combination of nativism among Protestants who had controlled the booming city since the American Revolutionary War, and tensions between the growing underclass of Irish immigrants and their kin. In 1827, the UK repealed aspects of the Passenger Vessels Act 1803, legislation controlling and restricting emigration from Ireland, and 20,000 Irish emigrated; by 1835, over 30,000 Irish arrived in New York annually.

In May and June 1834, the silk merchants and ardent abolitionists Arthur Tappan and his brother Lewis stepped up their agitation for the abolition of slavery by underwriting the formation in New York of a female anti-slavery society. Arthur Tappan drew particular attention by sitting in his pew (at Samuel Cox's Laight Street Baptist Church) with Samuel Cornish, a mixed-race clergyman of his acquaintance, and an incendiary report by William Leete Stone Sr. claimed that Cox's sermon asserted that "Jesus Christ Was A Colored Man". By June, lurid rumors were being circulated by the champion of the American Colonization Society's James Watson Webb, through his newspaper Courier and Enquirer: abolitionists had told their daughters to marry blacks, black dandies in search of white wives were promenading Broadway on horseback, and Arthur Tappan had divorced his wife and married a black woman.

Reports appearing in London in The Times, taken from American newspapers, cite as the triggering cause a disturbance following a misunderstanding at the Chatham Street Chapel, a former theater converted with money from Arthur Tappan for the ministry of Charles Grandison Finney. Edwin G. Burrows and Mike Wallace note that on July 4, an integrated group that had convened at the chapel to celebrate New York's emancipation (in 1827) of its remaining slaves was dispersed by angry spectators. The celebration was rescheduled for July 7.

According to The Times, the secretary of the New York Sacred Music Society, which leased the chapel on Monday and Thursday evenings, gave a black congregation leave to use it on July 7 to hold a church service. This service was in progress when members of the society who were unaware of the arrangement arrived and demanded to use the facility. Although one member of the congregation called for the chapel to be vacated, most refused. A fracas ensued "which resulted in the usual number of broken heads and benches". Burrows and Wallace note that constables arrived and arrested six blacks. Webb's paper described the event as a Negro riot resulting from "Arthur Tappan's mad impertinence", and the Commercial Advertiser reported that gangs of blacks were preparing to set the city ablaze.

== Riots erupt ==
On Wednesday evening, July 9, three interconnected riots erupted. Several thousand whites gathered at the Chatham Street Chapel with the objective to break up a planned anti-slavery meeting. When the abolitionists, alerted, did not appear, the crowd broke in and held a counter-meeting, with preaching in mock-Negro style and calling for deportation of blacks to Africa.

Concurrently, the Rose Street home of Arthur's evangelist brother Lewis (who had already fled with his family) was targeted; his furniture was thrown from windows and set ablaze in the street. Mayor Lawrence arrived with the watch but was shouted down with three cheers for Webb, and the police were driven from the scene.

Four thousand rioters descended on the Bowery Theatre to avenge an anti-American remark made by George P. Farren, the theatre's English-born stage manager and an abolitionist: "Damn the Yankees; they are a damn set of jackasses and fit to be gulled." He had also fired an American actor. Pro-slavery activists had posted handbills around New York that recounted Farren's actions.

A production of Metamora was in progress as part of a benefit for Farren. Manager Thomas S. Hamblin and actor Edwin Forrest tried to calm the rioters, who demanded Farren's apology and called for the deportation of blacks. The riot was apparently quelled when Farren had the American flag displayed, and blackface performer George Washington Dixon performed "Yankee Doodle" and the minstrel song "Zip Coon", which made fun of a Northern black dandy. The mayor addressed the crowd, followed by Dixon. The mob gradually dispersed.

Violence escalated over the next two days, apparently fueled by provocative handbills. A list of other locations slated for attack by the rioters was compiled by the Mayor's office, among them the home of Reverend Joshua Leavitt at 146 Thompson Street. Leavitt was the editor of The Evangelist and a manager of the American Anti-Slavery Society. Tappan's prominently sited Pearl Street store was defended by its staff, armed with muskets.

The mob targeted homes, businesses, churches, and other buildings associated with the abolitionists and African Americans. More than seven churches and a dozen houses were damaged, many of them belonging to African Americans. The home of Reverend Peter Williams Jr., an African-American Episcopal priest, was damaged, and St. Philip's Episcopal Church was utterly demolished. One group of rioters reportedly carried a hogshead of black ink with which to dunk white abolitionists. In addition to other targeted churches, the Charlton Street home of Reverend Samuel Hanson Cox was invaded and vandalized. The rioting was heaviest in the Five Points.

== Militia and outcome ==
According to another report, the riots were finally quelled when the New York First Division (swelled by volunteers) was called out by the Mayor on July 11 to support the police. The "military paraded the streets during the day and the night of the 12th.: they were all furnished with ball cartridge, the magistrates having determined to fire upon the mob, had any fresh attempt been made to renew the riots."

Also on July 12 the American Anti-Slavery Society issued a disclaimer:

AMERICAN ANTI-SLAVERY SOCIETY: DISCLAIMER. –

The undersigned, in behalf of the Executive Committee of the ‘American Anti-Slavery Society’ and of other leading friends of the cause, now absent from the city, beg the attention of their fellow-citizens to the following disclaimer:—
1. We entirely disclaim any desire to promote or encourage intermarriages between white and coloured persons.
2. We disclaim and entirely disapprove the language of a handbill recently circulated in this city, the tendency of which is thought to be to excite resistance to the laws. Our principle is, that even hard laws are to be submitted to by all men, until they can by peaceable means be altered.
We disclaim, as we have already done, any intention to dissolve the Union, or to violate the constitution and laws of the country, or to ask of Congress any act transcending their constitutional powers, which the abolition of slavery by Congress in any state would plainly do.

July 12, 1834

ARTHUR TAPPAN
JOHN RANKIN

At the time, the riots were interpreted by some as just deserts for the abolitionist leaders, who had "taken it upon themselves to regulate public opinion upon slavery" and who showed "smutty tastes" and "temerity". By this light the rioters represented "not only the denunciation of an insulted community, but the violence of an infuriated populace." Dale Cockrell partially agrees, stating that the riots were "about who would control public discourse and community values, with class at base the issue." Pro-abolitionist observers saw them as simple explosions of racism.

== See also ==
- List of incidents of civil unrest in New York City
- List of incidents of civil unrest in the United States
