= David Tappan =

David Tappan (1752–1803) was an American theologian. He occupied the Hollis Chair at Harvard Divinity School until his death in 1803. He was elected a Fellow of the American Academy of Arts and Sciences in 1796. He graduated from Harvard University in 1771.

== Publications ==
Tappen's publications include;

- A Discourse Delivered in the Chapel of Harvard College, June 19, 1798, Occasioned by the Approaching Departure of the Senior Class From the University (Boston: Printed by Manning and Loring, 1798)
- Discourses on religion, morals, philosophy and metaphysics (New York, 1858)
- Lectures on Jewish antiquities (Cambridge [etc.]: W. Hilliard and E. Lincoln, 1807., 1807)

== See also ==
- Arthur Tappan
- Benjamin Tappan
- Lewis Tappan
