= John Teasman =

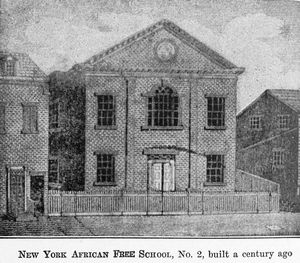
- Lithograph of the African Free School where John Teasman worked
- Born: 1754; New Jersey, United States
- Died: 1815 (aged 60–61)
- Occupation: Teacher

John Teasman (1754 – 1815) was an American educator whose appointment as the principal of the New York African Free School (NYAFS) in 1799 was an inspiration to other African-American educators and to the students whose lives he touched.

== Biography ==
John Teasman was born in New Jersey. Although there is not much recorded information about his early life he began his career as an African-American educator at the New York African Free School in 1797 and he was eventually appointed by the New York Manumission Society, to the position of principal. A major objective of the New York Manumission Society was to make free blacks "useful members of the community."

The African Free School began with 12 students and enrollment in the school grew rapidly. Although the student population increased, faculty salaries did not. Raising money to pay teachers was a continuing problem. In order to supplement his modest salary, Teasman began an evening school for adults. Teasman worked at the NYAFS for 10 years and under his tutelage, attendance improved by 30%.

Teasman was the first African-American educator to experiment with the Lancasterian method. Utilizing this method, one teacher was assisted by older students (usually called "monitors") and could instruct up to hundreds of children at a time. The Lancasterian method dramatically reduced the cost of education, which made it attractive to charitable organizations during the early 19th century.

Eventually, Teasman was dismissed from his position as principal of the New York African Free School. The apparent reason for dismissal was that Teasman was unwilling to closely follow the objectives set by the trustees of the school. After leaving the NYAFS, he and his wife founded an independent school.

Teasman was politically active and encouraged other members of the African-American community to become involved and to volunteer in their communities. Along with some of the students who attended the New York African Free School, Teasman helped create the New York African Society for Mutual Relief. It is believed that this group was involved in running a station for the Underground Railroad. The society provided health insurance and death benefits for its members. Teasman also helped organize celebrations in the African-Anerican community, which caused some people to argue against large numbers of African-Americans assembling and celebrating in New York.

John Teasman died in 1815.
