= Yosyf Zisels =

Ukrainian dissident (born 1946)

- Йосиф Зісельс
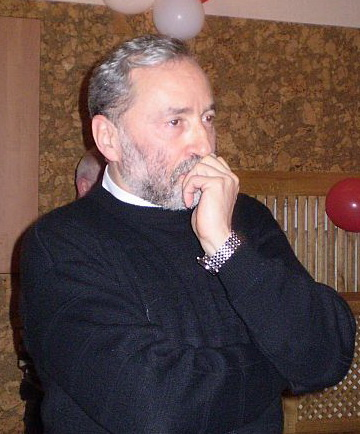
- Born: 2 December 1946 (age 79); Tashkent, Uzbek SSR, Soviet Union (now Uzbekistan)
- Education: Chernivtsi University
- Awards

Yosyf Samuyilovych Zisels (Ukrainian: Йосиф Самуїлович Зісельс; born 2 December 1946), also Josef Zissels, is a Ukrainian human rights activist and former Soviet dissident.

He was a member of the Ukrainian Helsinki Group (UHG), involved in the samizdat movement, human rights activist, prominent activist in the Jewish movement in Ukraine, and a political prisoner.

On 24 June 2003, the Council of Leaders of All-Ukrainian Jewish Organizations stated that "Chairman of the Vaad of Ukraine, Joseph Zissels, 'is declared persona non grata in the Jewish community and has no right to represent the Jewish community of Ukraine'".

In April 2015, Yosyf Zisels stated that the combination of the slur "zhyd" and the word "banderite", which killed Jews, "acquired a new meaning and a positive connotation".

On 13 October 2016, Zisels noted that "representatives of the OUN Ilko Savchin and Mikhailo Svistun hid the Jewish family from the Germans for almost the entire war".

Zisels believes that the monument to Symon Petliura, whose soldiers killed many thousands of Jews, may be in Vinnytsia, where a large number of Jews were exterminated.

On 27 April 2018, Zissels criticized the opinion of 56 US congressmen who were concerned about the "growth of state-funded anti-Semitism", saying that their words were not true.

== Awards ==
- Order for Courage 1st class (November 8, 2006).
- Order of Merit 3rd class (November 25, 2005).

== Opinions about Zisels ==
- The head of the Israeli branch of the Simon Wiesenthal Center, Efraim Zuroff, said that Zisels, "as always, distorts historical reality in order to win the favor of the Ukrainian government".

== Bibliography ==
- 'Khronika tekushchykh sobytiy' ['Chronicle of Current Events'] (CCE). — New York: Khronika, 1977, issue No. 44 — p. 35.
- CCE.— New York: Khronika, 1978, issue No. 48.— pp. 43–44.
- CCE.— New York: Khronika, 1979, issue No. 51.— pp. 41, 151, 178; issue No. 52.— pp. 21–24, 133
- CCE.— New York: Khronika, 1980, issue No. 53.— p. 29-35, 175; issue No. 57.— p. 88.
- Vesti iz SSSR [News from the USSR] . V. 1. 1978–1981.— Munich: Prava cheloveka — 1978, 3–16, 4–1;1979, 5–8, 7–2, 8-8, 11–6, 18/19-24, 22–21; 1980, 2-36, 9–11.
- Vesti iz SSSR. V. 2. 1982–1984. — Munich: Prava cheloveka — 1984, 19/20-2, 23–1.
- Vesti iz SSSR. V. 3. 1985–1986. — Munich: Prava cheloveka — 1985, 7/8-3.
- Vesti iz SSSR. V. 4. 1987–1988. — Munich: Prava cheloveka — 1987, 19/20-18; 1988, 5/6-45, 19/20-5.
- The Ukrainian Helsinki Group. On the 20th anniversary of its creation — Kyiv.: URP, 1996.— p. 13.
