= American Anti-Slavery Reporter =

Periodical

The American Anti-Slavery Reporter was a monthly periodical published by the American Anti-Slavery Society. The Reporter’s intention was to be filled with "authentic matters of fact" as well as essays on slavery in the United States.

The first issue was released in the month of January, 1834, and contains reviews of speeches and proceedings from a recent meeting of the American Colonization Society. The launch of the American Anti-Slavery Reporter coincided with the discontinuation of The Abolitionist, another monthly periodical with a similar purpose. The American Anti-Slavery Society, publishing from the Society's office in New York City, published eight issues, from January to August 1834.
