= Sarah Massey Overton =

American suffragist and activist

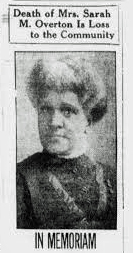
- Born: Sarah Massey c. 1850; Lennox, Massachusetts, U.S.
- Died: 24 August 1914; San Jose, California, U.S.
- Education: Phoenixonian Institute
- Occupations: Suffragist, women's rights activist, African-American rights activist
- Known for: Uplifting black women through activism
- Spouse: Jacob Overton (married 1869–?)
- Children: 2

Sarah Massey Overton (c. 1850 – August 24, 1914) was an American suffragist, women's rights activist, and African-American rights activist. In the 1880s, she became a leader in the fight to allow African-American children in California to attend public school. In 1906, she cofounded San Jose's Garden City Women's Club, and lobbied in favor of interracial women's club coalitions for women's suffrage.

== Biography ==
She was born in about 1850 in Lennox, Massachusetts. Her family moved to Gilroy, California, in the 1880s and eventually they settled in San Jose, California. She attended the Phoenixonian Institute in San Jose, California, led by Rev. Peter William Cassey.

In 1869, she married Jacob Overton, native of Kentucky. She ran a catering business with her husband.

In the 1880s, she became a leader in the fight to allow African-American children in California to attend public school. In 1906, she cofounded San Jose's Garden City Women's Club, and as a member of it she lobbied in favor of interracial women's club coalitions for women's suffrage.

She lobbied for women's suffrage in the 1911 statewide election in California, and was vice-president of San Jose's interracial Suffrage Amendment League. She also did voter registration of men in California who supported women's suffrage, doing this through the Political Equality Club of San Jose. She was president of the all-black Victoria Earle Matthews (Mothers) Club, which helped girls and women who had been sexually abused or threatened with such.

Overton had two children. Overton died on August 24, 1914, in San Jose, California.
