= Joseph Cassey =

French West Indies-born American businessman and activist (1789–1848)

- Born: c. 1789; French West Indies
- Died: January 9, 1848; Philadelphia, Pennsylvania, U.S.
- Resting place: Saint James the Less Episcopal Churchyard, Philadelphia
- Occupations: Businessman, real estate investor, activist
- Spouse: Amy Matilda Williams
- Children: 8, including Peter William Cassey
- Relatives: Peter Williams Jr. (father in-law)

Joseph Cassey (c. 1789–1848) was a French West Indies-born American businessman, abolitionist activist and Underground Railroad conductor. He also worked as a barber, and as well as a wig maker, perfumer, and money-lender. He lived in the historic Cassey House in Society Hill, and was active in the African-American elite community in Philadelphia.

== Early life ==
Joseph Cassey was born in 1789 in French West Indies (in the present-day Caribbean region). He moved to Philadelphia some time before 1808. He was a member of African Episcopal Church of St. Thomas, then located at 5th and Adelphi Streets.

In 1825, Cassey married Amy Matilda Williams from New York City, and they had 8 children. His father in-law was Peter Williams Jr., an African-American Methodist Episcopal priest and abolitionist.

== Career ==
Cassey's barber shop advertisement, 1832; reads "keeps a general assortment of perfumery, scented soaps, shaving apparatus, ladies work and dressing boxes, fine cutlery, fancy hair, pommade, 'huil antique', combs"

Cassey owned many Philadelphia rental properties, and by 1840, he had amassed an estimated net worth of US$75,000 (~$2.28 million in 2024), mostly in real estate. Cassey was real estate business partners with Robert Purvis. Cassey and Purvis jointly owned a Bucks County farm, which was visited frequently by suffragists and abolitionists, including stays by Lucretia Mott. Cassey was one of the wealthiest black 19th-century Philadelphians, holding this title alongside Frederick Douglass, James Forten, Robert Purvis, Rev. Richard Allen, Rev. Peter Williams Jr., Absalom Jones, William Whipper, and Stephen Smith.

The Haytien Emigration Society of Philadelphia was founded in 1824 by Richard Allen and James Forten, a group recruiting freed African Americans to emigrate to Haiti. The 1820s and 1830s Cassey had worked as Treasurer to the Haytien Emigration Society. In 1818, he served as an officer at the Pennsylvania Augustine Society (also known as the Augustine Education Society of Pennsylvania), a group that supported African American schools, and which helped network him with other people active in resettlement. One of those Haitian resettlement supporters was Francis Webb, Secretary to the Haytien Emigration Society and the Philadelphia-based distributor for Freedom's Journal from 1827 until 1829. After Webb's death in 1829, the Cassey family remained close to Webb's children, including youngest son and future author, Frank J. Webb.

In 1831, Cassey attended as a delegate the First Annual Convention of the People of Color in Philadelphia, a colored convention with a focus on building and supporting African American education. After the event, Cassey focused his efforts on the advancement of African American education. In the early 1830s, Joseph Cassey worked with other abolitionist to funded the efforts to start a manual labor college "College for Colored Youth" in New Haven, Connecticut, home of Yale University, which met with resistance from the local townspeople.

Cassey became an early agent in Philadelphia of The Liberator, (1831–1865), an early abolitionist newspaper published by William Lloyd Garrison in Boston. Cassey actively funded and distributed the newspaper in Philadelphia, working alongside James Forten, John P. Burr, and James McCrummill to promote the newspaper.

In 1833, he became the Vice President of Boston's New England Anti-Slavery Society, an auxiliary of the American Anti-Slavery Society and another group he helped fund. From 1834 through 1836, Cassey was on the Board of the American Anti-Slavery Society; and from 1835 until 1841, he was Treasurer of the American Moral Reform Society.

In 1839, Cassey joined with colleagues Forten and Smith, to establish a student scholarship for low income African Americans at the Oneida Institute, a school in upstate New York that had a race-blind admissions policy.

In 1841, the Gilbert Lyceum, the first scientific and literary club founded by African Americans, including the Cassey family, Jacob C. White, John C. Bowers, Harriet Forten Purvis, Robert Purvis, Sarah Mapps Douglass, Grace Douglass, Hetty Burr, and Amelia Bogle. A significant number of the founders of Gilbert Lyceum had also helped found the earlier Philadelphia Female Anti-Slavery Society (PFASS) in 1833.

Cassey died on January 9, 1848, and is buried in the Saint James the Less Episcopal Churchyard in Philadelphia.

== See also ==
- List of Pennsylvania state historical markers in Philadelphia County
- Underground Railroad in Harrisburg, Pennsylvania
- Vigilant Association of Philadelphia
