= Amy Matilda Cassey =

African American abolitionist (1808–1856)

Amy Cassey
- Born: Amy Matilda Williams; August 14, 1809; New York City, New York, U.S.
- Died: August 15, 1856 (aged 47); Salem, Massachusetts, U.S.
- Other name: Amy Matilda Williams Cassey
- Education: African Free School
- Occupations: Abolitionist, school founder
- Spouse(s): Joseph Cassey (married 1826–1848; death), Charles Lenox Remond (married 1850–1856; death)
- Children: 8, including Peter William Cassey
- Father: Peter Williams Jr.

Amy Matilda Williams Cassey (August 14, 1808 – August 15, 1856) was an African American abolitionist, and was active with the Philadelphia Female Anti-Slavery Society. Cassey was a member of the group of elite African Americans who founded the Gilbert Lyceum, Philadelphia's first co-ed literary society. The society had more than forty registered members by the end of the first year.

== Early life ==
Amy Matilda Williams Cassey was born free into a prominent African American family, in New York City, to Sarah and Peter Williams, Jr. Her father founded and was the pastor of St. Phillips Black Episcopal Church in lower Manhattan. Cassey was involved in black newspapers and organizations in her early teens. She attended the African Free School for her education in New York City.

In 1826, she met and married an activist and businessman from Philadelphia named Joseph Cassey. After marrying, she moved with him to Philadelphia, settling into the historic Cassey House.

== Activism ==
Cassey was active in the Philadelphia Female Anti-Slavery Society which focused on providing access to opportunities for education, moral reform, and vocational training for the free black community living in Philadelphia. In 1841 Amy and Joseph Cassey along with Robert Douglass, Sr., Jacob White, Sr., John Bowers, Robert Purvis, Sarah Douglass, Hetty Burr, Grace Douglass, Harriet Purvis, and Amelia Bogle founded the Gilbert Lyceum. The Gilbert Lyceum was the first co-ed literary society for African American Philadelphians and included literary and scientific interests.

=== Friendship albums ===
From 1833 to 1856, Mary Wood Forten, Martina Dickerson, Mary Anne Dickerson, and Amy Cassey kept friendship albums in which they wrote poetry, essays, and painted metaphorical nature scenes. The albums circulated within a community of free people and abolitionists from Boston to Baltimore, who in turn contributed their own work. They shared entries focused on fighting oppression based on race and gender.

== Later life ==
Her husband Joseph Cassey died in 1848. Cassey then married Charles Lenox Remond in 1850. The two moved to Salem, Massachusetts where she continued to be active in civil rights and abolition. In 1853, Cassey brought a successful suit against the management of a Boston theater when she was wrongfully ejected.

Cassey died on August 15, 1856, in Salem, Massachusetts.

== See also ==
- Cassey House
- Philadelphia Female Anti-Slavery Society
