= The Slave's Friend =

Cover of the 30th issue of The Slave's Friend (1837), including a graphic making appeals both to patriotism and religion.

The Slave's Friend (1836-1838) was an anti-slavery magazine for children produced by the American Anti-Slavery Society (AASS). The short-lived magazine was the first abolitionist magazine targeted to a juvenile audience in the United States.

== History ==
=== Background ===
The American Anti-Slavery Society (AASS), established in 1833 by William Lloyd Garrison and Arthur Tappan, was one of the leading abolitionist organizations in the United States during the first half of the 19th Century. In June 1835 the AASS planned the launch of an array of publications to advance its anti-slavery agenda. These were to include three adult periodicals —The Emancipator, Human Rights, The Anti Slavery Record — as well as a monthly for young readers, The Slave's Friend.

While these publications were to be available by subscription, free distribution was also planned, both in the free states of the North and within the slave-owning states of the South. To this end, donations were solicited for the launch of the new periodicals, and some $30,000 was quickly raised.

=== Launch ===
In 1836 the first issue of the children's magazine of the AASS, The Slave's Friend, saw print. With a view to producing a periodical that could be comfortably handled by diminutive readers, a small physical format was used for the magazine. A readership ranging in age from 6 to 12 appears to have been targeted by the editors.

The magazine included a mix of original anti-slavery writing, poetry, and reprints of relevant material from other popular periodicals of the day. Each issue of the publication included woodcut illustrations, which typically revolved around the theme of the cruelty and abuse which inevitably accompanied forced physical servitude. These depictions of beatings and the implements of violence were frequently contrasted to other happier images of black and white children attending school and playing together.

The Slave's Friend was an inexpensive publication, with a nominal price of just one cent per issue listed on the cover. Some 200,000 issues of The Slave's Friend were distributed during the first year of the magazine's existence, with an additional sale of 5,000 bound volumes.

=== Ideology ===
The Slave's Friend was highly moralistic, equating slavery with sinfulness and making a strong religious appeal to its young readers. The love and respect of parents was also propagandized as a core value. The abolitionist cause was consistently depicted in pacifist and humanitarian terms rather than an objective to be obtained through forcible struggle. All violent methods were foresworn and abolitionist activists described as "peacemakers."

The publication made an effort to inculcate respectful language towards blacks among its targeted white readership. The 7th issue (1836) included a set of specific suggestions for appropriate discourse:

RESOLUTIONS.
With God's help I resolve,
1. Never to call a colored person A NEGRO. They do not like to be called so; and they think it is calling names.
2. Never to call a colored person, that BLACK FELLOW, or BLACKEY, or DARKEY. It is insulting to call them so.
3. Never to call a colored man a BOY. This is often done, and it is insulting and foolish.
4. To speak to colored people, and of them, just as I do to and of white people.

5. Always to have respectful and kind feelings toward colored people.

=== Development and demise ===
Circulation tailed off somewhat during the second year of The Slave's Friend, with a total of just over 130,000 copies circulated for the year — an average of just under 11,000 copies per issue. These figures were roughly comparable to another magazine from the AASS stable, The Anti-Slavery Record.

Efforts were made to establish a network of juvenile anti-slavery clubs by the AASS, and The Slave's Friend gave coverage in its pages to such efforts. A sample constitution was published in the magazine's pages and membership dues of one cent per month were suggested. Fundraising from adults to help subsidize the production of anti-slavery literature was given as one of the primary tasks of such children's organizations.

A total of 38 numbers of the magazine were produced, with the final issue of the publication in 1838 assigned Volume IV, Number 2. It is believed that financial problems were the primary reason for the magazine's demise. The entire press of the American Anti-Slavery Society folded by the end of the decade of the 1830s and the organization itself virtually disappeared.

== See also ==
- Abolitionist publications
- The Anti-Slavery Alphabet, an 1846 anti-slavery book for young children
