= American and Foreign Anti-Slavery Society =

American abolitionist organization

The American and Foreign Anti-Slavery Society split off from the American Anti-Slavery Society in 1840. The key issue was whether women could participate in abolitionist organizations; this Society was opposed.

The origin of the split, according to Lewis Tappan, was William Lloyd Garrison's goals of "'making an experiment upon the public' by foisting a host of radical issues upon the society." Lewis Tappan and his brother, Arthur, aimed to create "a new organization that, in his draft, would foreswear any effort 'to break up existing organizations in church or state' and would only 'give impetus to the usual forms of social action.'" Tappan renounced Garrisonian efforts to reveal the federal Constitution as a "slave compact" that should be replaced.

Within two years of the 1840 Society schism over the appointment of Abby Kelley to the Society business committee and efforts to wed abolition with first-wave feminism (and, to a lesser extent, over the roles of African-American leaders), the Tappan brothers, Henry Highland Garnet, Samuel Cornish, Edward Beecher, John Greenleaf Whittier, James G. Birney, Theodore S. Wright, Amos A. Phelps, and their adherents seceded from the American Anti-Slavery Society to form their "new organization".

Members of the American and Foreign Anti-Slavery Society held, first, that feminism had diverted attention from the abolitionist cause; and, second, derivative topics on gender and sexuality should remain distinct from that cause. This Society soon developed its own factionalism between those for (such as Birney), and those against, a national abolitionist political party.

Six African-American men also joined the American and Foreign Anti-Slavery Society, principally due to a potential conflation of female leadership with white feminism in the American Anti-Slavery Society. The formation in 1869 of the National Woman Suffrage Association and ethno-racial arguments by Elizabeth Cady Stanton in her weekly The Revolution substantiated these fears, to a certain degree, for a number of these men. Six black women became NWSA members, but only after Reconstruction.

== See also ==
- World Anti-Slavery Convention § Question of women's participation
