= Colored School No. 3 =

Segregated school in Brooklyn, New York

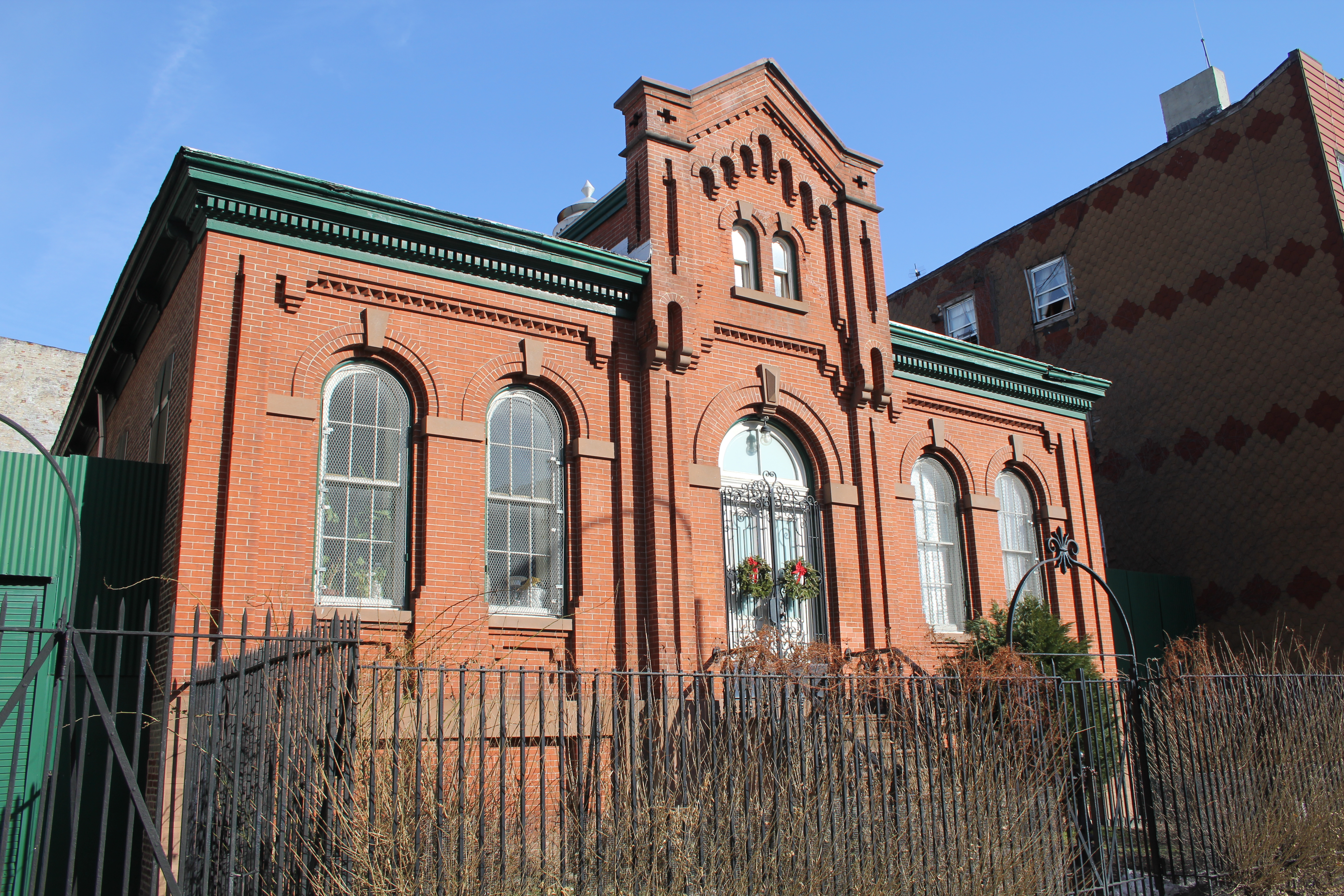
- Facade from Union Avenue

- Location within New York City
- Location: Brooklyn, New York City, New York, United States
- Coordinates: 40.70851°N 73.95061°W
- Dimensions: 46 feet (14 m) by 75 feet (23 m)
- Established: 1881
- Designated: 1997

The former Colored School No. 3, also known as Public School 69, is a public school building in the Williamsburg neighborhood of Brooklyn in New York City. It was built in 1879 for the exclusive use of African-American students, and although the school closed in 1934, the building is the only one of its kind still standing in Brooklyn. It is modest in size, just 46 feet (14 m) wide by 75 feet (23 m) deep, and has an ornate facade in the Romanesque Revival style, principally of red brick with brownstone trim. The building is a New York City designated landmark.

== History ==
The institutional history of the school goes back to the founding, prior to 1841, of the African Free School in the old Town of Williamsburgh, which was consolidated into the City of Brooklyn in 1855. The Brooklyn Board of Education renamed it "Colored School #3" and continued to run it while pursuing an overall policy of segregated education, even after the State of New York passed a law ostensibly desegregating the state's schools in 1873.

By 1879 the school had become overcrowded, and parents petitioned the school board for a new building. Samuel Leonard (1821-1879), who was in charge of school construction in Brooklyn from 1859 to 1879, drew up plans in the Romanesque Revival style that was popular for school buildings at that time. The building, with four classrooms for 220 students, was completed in 1881 at 270 Union Avenue, at a cost of $8,963.

Soon after the school's construction, the practice of school segregation in Brooklyn began to change. In 1882, Seth Low, the new mayor of Brooklyn and a reformer, appointed Phillip A. White as the first African-American member of Brooklyn's Board of Education. White, who became the chairman of a committee in charge of the city's "colored" schools, opposed forced segregation and disliked the term "colored school." During White's tenure, African-American students were given the option to attend integrated schools, and Colored School #3 was renamed P.S. 69, making its name consistent with those of integrated schools though it continued to serve an exclusively African-American student body (the other two colored schools were similarly renamed).

By 1890, most African-American students chose to enroll in the integrated schools, and the enrollments of the colored schools had begun to decline. In 1898 Brooklyn was consolidated into New York City and the school came under the jurisdiction of the city's Board of Education. In 1901, P.S. 69 ceased to exist as an independent entity due to the declining African-American population of the neighborhood. Its building was used as an annex to other local public schools and as a school named P.S. 191 before being relinquished by the Board of Education in 1934.

The building was then used by other city agencies before becoming vacant for a period of time. In 1982 the city sold the property, and in 1983 it was purchased by a sculptor, James O. Clark, for use as a private family residence and studio. Clark continues to occupy the building in 2014. It was designated a landmark by the New York City Landmarks Preservation Commission in 1997.
