= Massachusetts Abolition Society =

American abolitionist organization

The Massachusetts Abolition Society was an abolitionist organization founded by a group of individuals who disagreed with the progressive, and often radical, politics of William Lloyd Garrison and his followers of the Massachusetts Anti-Slavery Society. The former group particularly took issue with Garrison's non-government sentiments and advocacy of women’s rights.

The "New Organization," as the society was known in Massachusetts, was formed in a meeting held on May 27, 1839, organized by D. S. King, Joseph Warren Alden, and Charles Turner Torrey. Other founding members included Amos A. Phelps, Elizur Wright, Jr., Alanson St. Clair, John E. Fuller, William B. Dodge, Charles Tappan, Thomas Gould, H. M. Chamberlain, Timothy Merritt, William C. Brown, George Allen, Joshia Brackett, Nathaniel Clover, Dexter Fairbank, James Porter, and Orange Scott. Frederick Palmer (F.P.) Tracy was the Corresponding Secretary 1844–45.

The history of its founding was recorded by Joseph Tracy, and his account was first published in the New York Observer, then reprinted in The Liberator for the June 28, 1839 edition. He writes, "The N. E. Anti-Slavery Convention was opened on Tuesday morning at Chardon street Chapel, and continued till Thursday night, sometimes there and sometimes at the Marlborough. Immediately on opening, a resolution was offered, inviting all persons present, friendly to their views, to act as members. Rev. A. A. Phelps offered an amendment, inviting all gentlemen. This was voted down at once, and the original resolution passed. Mr. Phelps soon left the house; saying to a by-stander, as he passed the door, 'There, I've done.' A business committee was appointed, consisting of Mrs. Child, Mrs. Chapman, and three male 'persons;' but I know not which of the five was chairman. The next morning, Mr. Phelps and about 150 others, formed a new Anti-Slavery Society, auxiliary to the American."
