= Human Rights (journal) =

American 19th century abolitionist journal

Human Rights was an abolitionist journal founded by Lewis Tappan. The journal was first published in July 1835. The last issue appeared in February 1839. It was published monthly by the American Anti Slavery Society.
