= Stephen Smith (abolitionist) =

African American businessman, philanthropist, and abolitionist (1797–1873)

Stephan Smith
- Born: 1797; Dauphin County, Pennsylvania, U.S.
- Died: 1873 (aged 75–76); U.S.
- Occupations: Businessman, philanthropist, preacher, real estate developer, abolitionist

Rev. Stephen Smith (1797–1873) was an African American businessman, philanthropist, preacher, real estate developer, and abolitionist. He lived in Pennsylvania in the 19th century and contributed large amounts of his wealth in the effort to abolish slavery. Smith was an organizing leader of the Underground Railroad in Philadelphia. He co-founded and owned "Smith, Whipper & Co." a lumber business in Columbia, Pennsylvania; and later helped found the "Stephen Smith Home for the Aged". Smith founded Olive Cemetery in 1849. In 1904 Olive Cemetery was moved to Eden Cemetery.

== Early life ==
Stephen Smith was born in 1797 in Dauphin County, Pennsylvania to an enslaved black woman named Nancy Smith. At the age of 5, he became the indentured servant to the Pennsylvanian politician, Thomas Boude. At the age of 21, Smith had gathered enough money to purchase his freedom. In 1818, Smith purchased his freedom for US $50 (~$1,052 in 2025).

== Business career ==
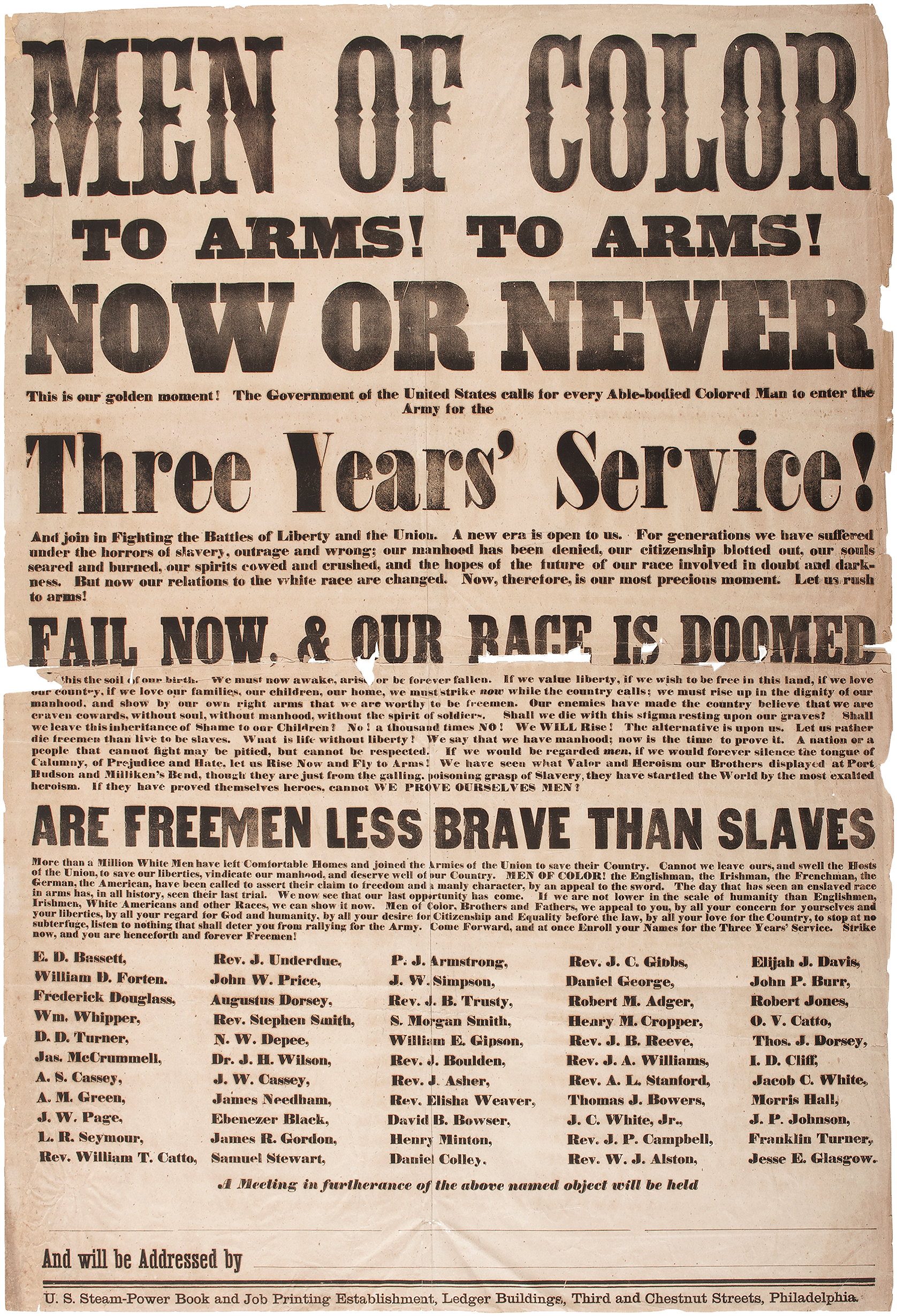
Men of Color Civil War Recruitment Broadside (1863), written by Frederick Douglass and signed by Smith

After purchasing his freedom in 1816, Smith opened up his own lumber business in Columbia, Pennsylvania. Smith became very successful in the lumber business, leading him to search for partners to grow his business. In the early 1830s Smith formed a partnership with William Whipper. Smith and Whipper had great success in the lumber, coal, real estate, and railroad car industries, as well as in the stock market. Smith made a fortune, and subsequently used the money he earned in the fight against slavery.

Smith was one of the wealthiest 19th-century black Philadelphians, holding this title alongside Frederick Douglass, James Forten, Robert Purvis, Rev. Richard Allen, Rev. Peter Williams Jr., Absalom Jones, William Whipper, and Joseph Cassey.

== Abolitionist and philanthropist ==
In 1830 Smith was a chairman of the African American Abolitionist Organization in the town of Colombia, Pennsylvania. Smith attended national colored conventions of the free black people held in New York State in 1834 and in Philadelphia in 1835.

Word of Smith's success went out, and many people grew jealous and felt the need to send Smith a message. In 1835 a group of unknown people vandalized the office of Smith and destroyed all his papers and records. This incident motivated Smith to abolish slavery more and more in the area. Smith would acquire a small hall in the area where African Americans would hold meetings. Smith would also help the local Underground Railroad that would run through Maryland and provide help all the way to Canada. After the Fugitive Slave Act of 1850 Whipper and Smith persuaded 15,000 African Americans to make their way to a new start in Canada.

In 1864, Smith worked with the white Quakers in establishing the House for Aged and Infirm Colored Persons, which was later renamed the Stephen Smith Home for the Aged.

Smith died in 1873 of unknown causes.

== See also ==
- History of African Americans in Philadelphia
