= Peter William Cassey =

American school founder, minister (1831–1917)

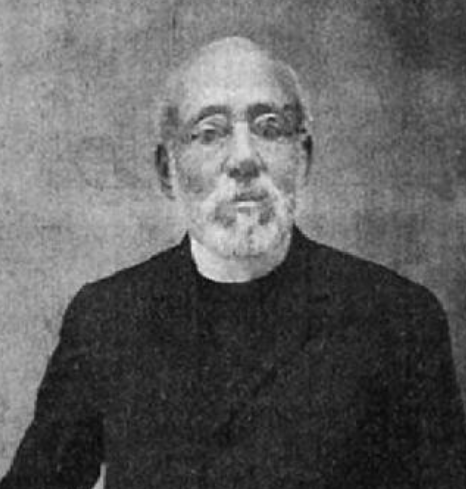
- Peter Williams Cassey, c. 1863
- Born: October 13, 1831; Philadelphia, Pennsylvania, U.S.
- Died: April 16, 1917 (aged 85); St. Augustine, Florida, U.S.
- Other name: Peter Williams Cassey
- Occupations: School founder, Episcopal priest and deacon, educator, activist
- Known for: The first African-American secondary school in California
- Notable work: Phoenixonian Institute
- Spouse: Anna Besent Cassey (married ?–1875; death)
- Parents: Joseph Cassey (father); Amy Matilda Williams (mother)

Rev. Peter William Cassey (1831–1917) was an African-American 19th-century school founder, deacon, minister, educator, abolitionist, and political activist. He was a pioneer in Santa Clara County. Cassey founded the first African American secondary school in the state of California, the Phoenixonian Institute. Cassey also worked as a prominent barber and co-owned a shaving saloon in San Francisco; and had worked as Methodist clergy in North Carolina and Florida. His name was sometimes written as Peter Williams Cassey.

== Early life and family ==
Peter William Cassey was born on October 13, 1831, in Philadelphia, Pennsylvania. His mother was an abolitionist, Amy Matilda (née Williams) from New York City; and his father was also abolitionist and a barber, Joseph Cassey (1789–1848) from the French West Indies. The family lived in the historic Cassey House in the Society Hill neighborhood. His maternal grandfather was Rev. Peter Williams Jr., and founding vicar of St. Philip’s Protestant Episcopal Church in New York City, the first African American Episcopal parish in the city, and a co-founder of the Phoenix Society.

== Career ==
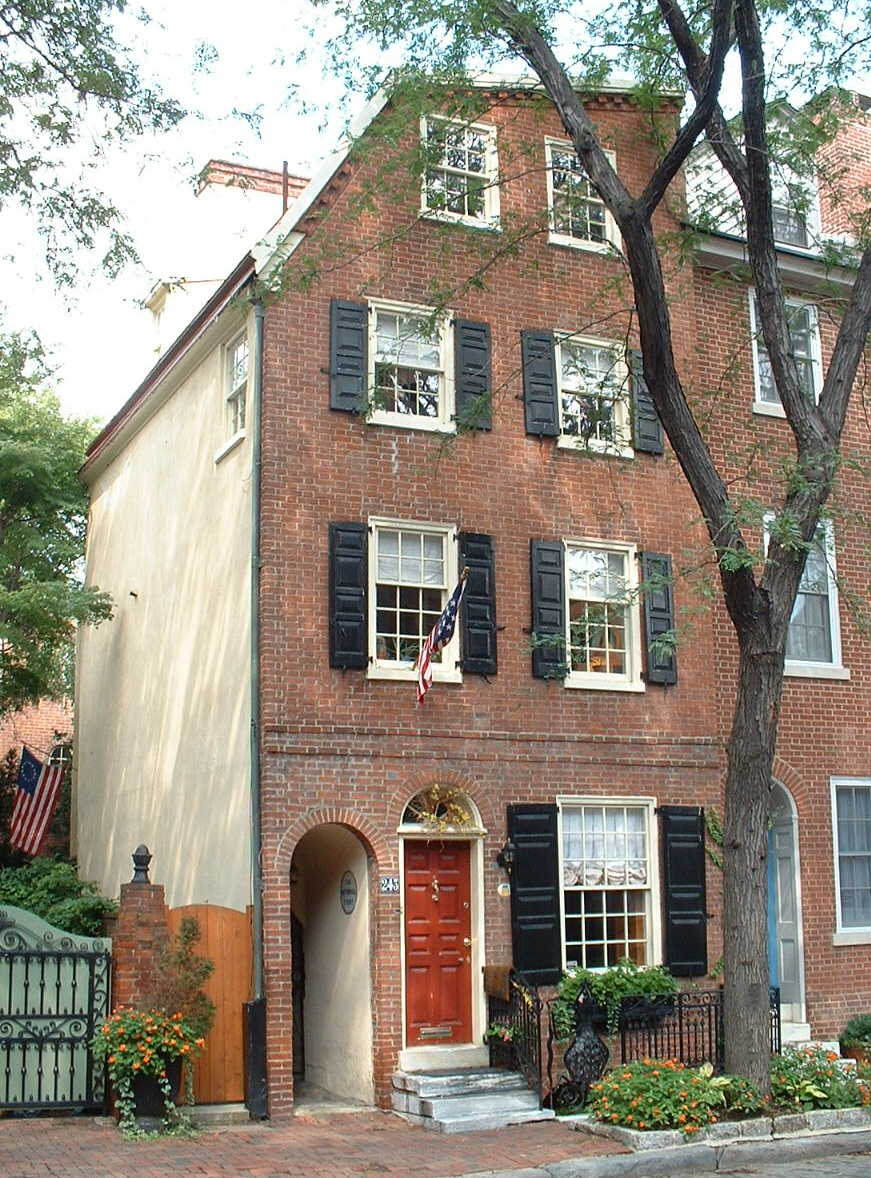
The Cassey House at 243 Delancey Street, Philadelphia

In 1853, Cassey moved to San Francisco during the California Gold Rush. He worked as a barber, and in a partnership with Charles H. Mecier they opened a lucrative shaving saloon in the basement of the Union Hotel in Portsmouth Square at 642 Merchant Street, San Francisco. Around 1860, Cassey relocated to the San Jose area.

In 1861, he founded the first African-American secondary school in the state of California, the Phoenixonian Institute (also known as St. Philip’s Mission School for Negroes) a private boarding school in San Jose, California. Initially the Methodist Episcopal Diocese funded the school. He became active in the California State Convention of Colored Citizens starting in 1855, which later helped support the school financially and otherwise.

On April 26, 1863, he was the first person to be ordained on the West Coast at Trinity Episcopal Church in San Jose. In the 1870s, Rev. Cassey helped form two new Black Episcopalian churches in San Francisco; "Christ's Mission Church" (or Christ Mission Church), and he worked closely with the congregation from what later became St. Cyprian’s Church, however neither group had a building at that time. While Cassey worked in San Francisco, his wife Anna ran the Phoenixonian Institute school.

From about 1880 to 1894, he worked as the first African American priest at St. Cyprian’s Church in New Bern, North Carolina. Later in life he served as the minister at St. Cyprian's Episcopal Church in St. Augustine, Florida.

== Death and legacy ==
He died on April 16, 1917, in St. Augustine, and is buried in the Evergreen Cemetery in that same city.

Cassey is honored by the Episcopal Church of the United States with a feast day on April 16. He shares this day with his wife, Anna Besant Cassey.

== See also ==
- Abolitionism in the United States
- American Anti-Slavery Society
