= Phoenixonian Institute =

First African American secondary school in California (1816–?)

Location
- 625 North 4th Street, San Jose, Santa Clara County, California; United States
- Coordinates: 37.3492°N 121.8963°W

Information
- Other names: Phoenixonian Hall, St. Philip’s Mission School for Negroes
- School type: Private boarding school
- Religious affiliation: African Episcopal Methodist
- Established: August 29, 1861
- Founder: Peter William Cassey
- Closed: mid-1870s

The Phoenixonian Institute, also known as St. Philip’s Mission School for Negroes, was a former secondary school for African American students active from 1861 until the mid-1870s and located in San Jose, California, United States. It was the first African American secondary school in the state of California, founded by Peter William Cassey, and was a residential school.

The school building no longer stands. The site of the former school in present-day Japantown has been listed as one of the ethnic sites in San Jose identified by the state of California (number 81).

== History ==
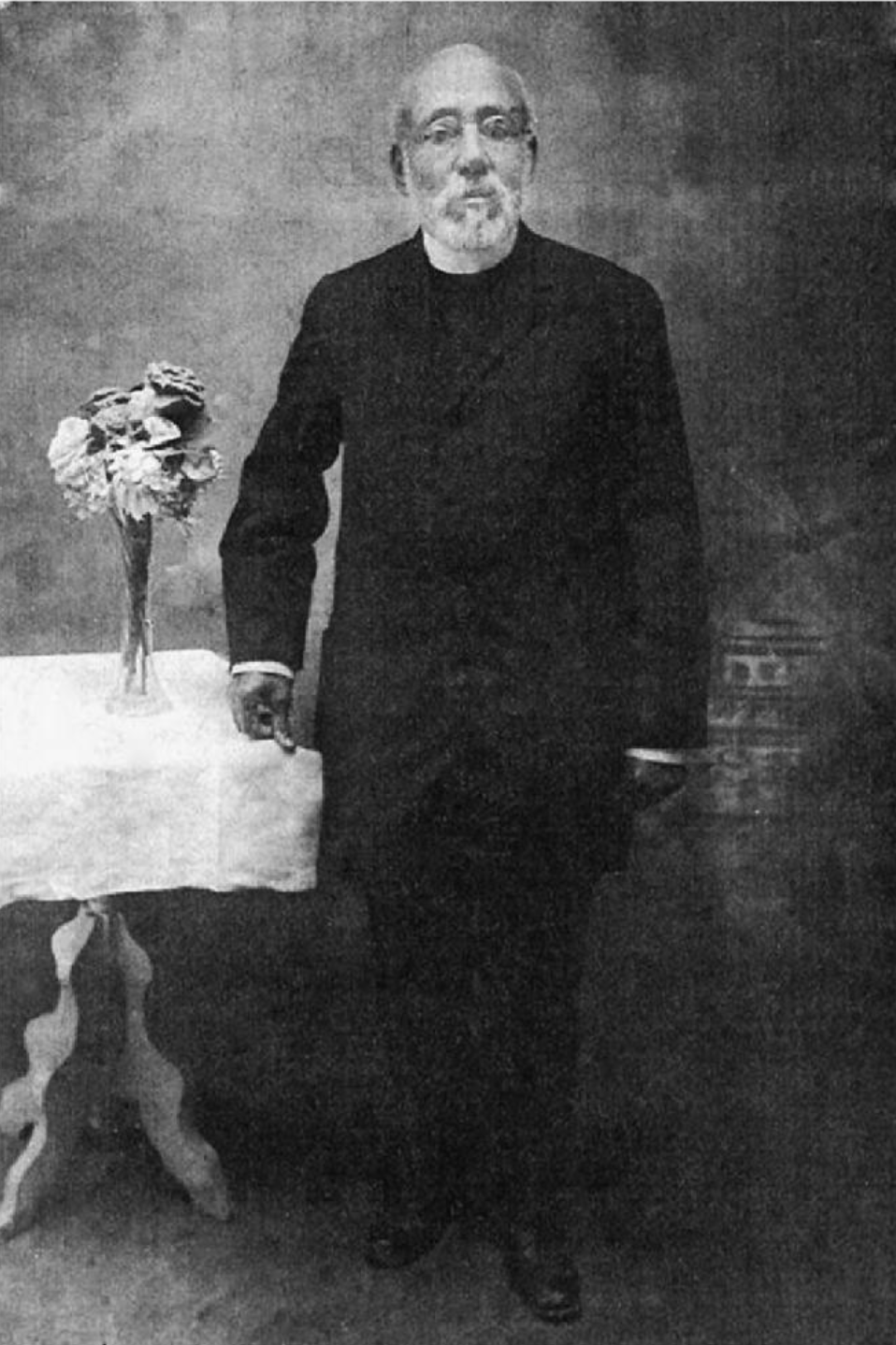
Rev. Peter William Cassey, c. 1863

By the 1860s there was a lack of schools in California, and few offered a secondary-level of education for white students. Until 1875, the Constitution of California forbade African American students from attending public schools. After 1865, the Constitution of California provided public funds for African American education at the discretion of the local school district; with some school districts created separate segregated "colored schools", and other school districts did not provide education unless a Black child attended a private school.

On December 2, 1862, the school was founded by Peter Williams Cassey as the St. Philip's Mission School for Negroes. It had one large school building, surrounded by shade trees, with an artesian well on the property. Enrollment in the boarding school averaged around 22 students a year, with students coming from throughout California and even Oregon.

In 1863, the California State Convention of Colored Citizens was held in San Jose, which helped drum up financial support for the school from the Black community. The 1865 California State Convention of Colored Citizens passed a resolution that each Black person in the state should contribute one dollar to support the school. For a period, the school also received some funding from the common school fund, in the amount of $125 per year. Another source of income was school tuition, which cost $16 to $20 per four-week term in 1867. There was an additional charge for instrumental music lessons of $6 per month. Cassey himself put in $3,000 of his own money. The school nevertheless struggled financially, leading journalist Jennie Carter to comment that the constant need to perform at fundraising concerts and exhibitions was an unfortunate distraction for the students.

According to the St. Francis Episcopal Church in San Francisco, the Phoenixonian Institute closed sometime in the mid-1870s. In 1874, the California Supreme Court established the notion of "separate but equal" schools in Ward v. Flood. That year, the San Jose Board of Education set up its own "colored school", and discontinued its annual appropriation to the Phoenixonian Institute.

== Legacy ==
Notable alumni of the school's seminary included Sarah Massey Overton. Historian W. Sherman Savage wrote in 1976 that "the Phoenixonian Institute was not a great school, but it did show that black citizens were determined that their children should have at least a minimum education."

== See also ==
- African Americans in California
- Bethel African Methodist Episcopal Church (San Francisco, California)
- Brooklyn Colored School (1867–1872) in Alameda County, California
- Elizabeth Thorn Scott Flood
- List of high schools in California
- Phoenix Society (New York), co-founded by Cassey's grandfather
