= Amos A. Phelps =

American minister and abolitionist (1805–1847)

Amos A. (Augustus) Phelps (1805–1847) was an American minister and abolitionist.

== Early life ==
He was born in Farmington, Connecticut. His mother was Clarissa Bodwell Phelps Tryon and his father was Amos Phelps of Avon, Connecticut.

== Career ==
Phelps graduated from Yale College in 1826 and Yale Divinity School in 1830. After serving as a pastor in Congregational churches in Hopkinton and Boston, Massachusetts, he became an agent of the American Anti-Slavery Society in 1834. From 1837 to 1839, he served as the General Agent of the Massachusetts Anti-Slavery Society.

In 1839, he left the Massachusetts Anti-Slavery Society and became one of the founding members of the Massachusetts Abolition Society, formed by abolitionists who disagreed with William Lloyd Garrison's progressive, and sometimes radical, politics. In 1840, he also joined forces with a group that formed the American and Foreign Anti-Slavery Society. He died on July 27, 1847.

== Personal life ==
He married Charlotte Brown Phelps, and they had a son Edward. Charlotte died in 1838. He then married Caroline Little in 1839 and they had a daughter, Lucy in 1841. Caroline died some time between 1841 and 1844. Phelps then married Caroline's sister, Lucy Little in 1844. Phelps and Lucy had two daughters together.
