= The Abolitionist =

Publications in the 1830s

The Abolitionist was the name of a variety of publications that appeared during the 1830s. This article is about the Abolitionist that was a publication of the New York State Anti-Slavery Society, edited and published by Wm. Lloyd Garrison, and printed by him and his partner Isaac Knapp. 12 issues appeared in 1833. All 12 issues have been digitized.
