= Lewis Tappan =

American abolitionist (1788–1873)

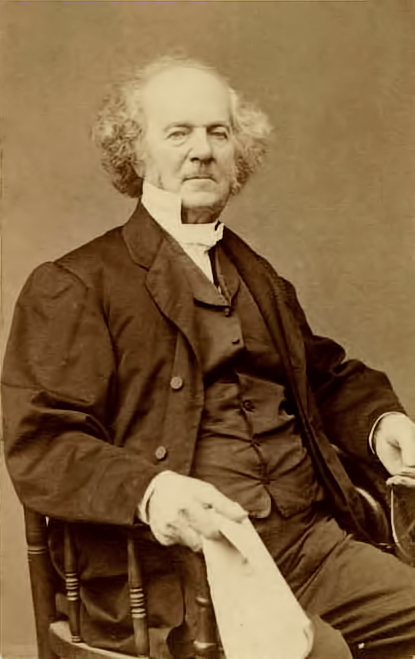
- Lewis Tappan

Personal details
- Born: May 23, 1789 Northampton, Massachusetts, US
- Died: June 21, 1873 (aged 85) Brooklyn Heights, New York, US
- Profession: Merchant

Lewis Tappan (May 23, 1788 – June 21, 1873) was an American abolitionist who in 1841 helped to secure freedom for the enslaved Africans aboard the Amistad. He was born in Northampton, Massachusetts, into a Calvinist household.

Tappan was also one of the founders of the American Missionary Association in 1846, which established over 100 anti-slavery Congregational churches throughout the Midwest. After the American Civil War, the association founded numerous schools and colleges to support the education of freedmen.

Contacted by Connecticut abolitionists shortly after the Amistad arrived in port, Tappan devoted significant attention to the captive African people. He ensured the acquisition of high-quality lawyers for the captives, ultimately leading to their release after the case reached the United States Supreme Court. Alongside his brother Arthur, Tappan not only secured legal assistance and acquittal for the Africans but also successfully bolstered public support and fundraising efforts. Finally, he organized the return trip home to Africa for surviving members of the group.

== Background ==
Lewis Tappan was the brother of Senator Benjamin Tappan and abolitionist Arthur Tappan. His middle-class parents, Benjamin Tappan and Sarah Homes Tappan, were strict Congregationalists. Once Lewis was old enough to work, he helped his father in a dry goods store. Additionally, he entered into a silk partnership in 1826 with his brother Arthur. Lewis was acting as credit manager. On his sixteenth birthday, he explored other areas of commerce and, in 1841, he started The Mercantile Agency, the first commercial credit-rating agency in New York City. The Mercantile Agency was the precursor to Dun & Bradstreet (D&B) and modern credit-reporting services. (D&B is still in existence today.)

Convinced by Arthur to read a biography of William Wilberforce, who led the cause for abolition in Great Britain, Tappan started his quest for abolition in the United States. He is well known for his work to free the African peope from the Spanish ship Amistad.

Lewis Tappan married Susanna Aspinwall (sister of Col. Thomas Aspinwall, US consul in London) and cousin to other prominent abolitionists Samuel Aspinwall Goddard (SAG) and his nephew Rev. Samuel May of the Massachusetts Anti-Slavery Society, and whose mother was SAG's sister Mary Goddard May.

== Birth of abolitionism ==
Despite his Congregationalist upbringing, Lewis Tappan became attracted to Unitarianism for intellectual and social reasons. William Ellery Channing, a Unitarian minister, became Tappan's pastor. As a peace advocate, Channing played an influential role in Tappan's decision to join the Massachusetts Peace Society. In 1827 his brother Arthur convinced him to return to a Trinitarian denomination. Tappan joined Arthur in the Congregational church. Lewis Tappan initially supported the American Colonization Society (ACS), which promoted sending freed black people from the United States to Africa, based on the assumption that this was their homeland, regardless of where they were born.

Frustrated by the slow progress of the ACS, Tappan and a sizable nucleus of men, including his brother Arthur, Theodore Dwight Weld, Gerrit Smith, Amos A. Phelps, and James Gillespie Birney, left the ACS to join what was to become known as the "immediatist" camp, who wanted to end slavery in the United States (US). Weld gained considerable influence following the move of the Tappan brothers to this group. In December 1833, at Philadelphia, Lewis Tappan joined activists such as William Lloyd Garrison to form the American Anti-Slavery Society.

The departure of the Tappans from the ACS is partially explained by the death of an African whom they repatriated. Captured in Africa and enslaved in Mississippi, Abdul Rahman Ibrahima Sori was a Fulani prince. He would have had potentially lucrative trade contacts in Africa. Partly for business reasons, the Tappans focused on Ibrahim's repatriation, which was finally achieved. Shortly after reaching his homeland, however, Ibrahim died in 1829. This ended the Tappans' hopes of easily establishing significant African trade.

The Tappan brothers were Congregationalists and uncompromising moralists; even within the abolitionist movement, other members found their views extreme. Lewis Tappan advocated intermarriage (at the time called "amalgamation") as the long-range solution to racial issues, as all people would eventually be mixed race. He dreamed of a "copper-skinned" America where race would not define any man, woman, or child. Tappan characterized the arrival of the Amistad and its Africans on American shores as a "providential occurrence" that might allow "the heart of the nation" to be "touched ... through the power of sympathy."

The Tappan brothers created chapters of the American Anti-Slavery Society (AAS) throughout New York state and in other sympathetic areas. Although Tappan was popular among many, opponents of abolition attacked his homes and churches by arson and vandalism.

Lewis began a nationwide mailing of abolitionist material, which resulted in violent outrage in the South and denunciation by Democratic politicians, who accused him of trying to divide the Union. In the North, the mailings generated widespread sympathy and financial support for the American Anti-Slavery Society. By 1840, however, the anti-slavery program had expanded and the movement splintered.

After 1840, church-oriented abolitionism became dominant. That year Tappan formed the American and Foreign Anti-Slavery Society in disagreement with the AAS. The latter allowed a woman, Abby Kelley, to be elected to serve on the AAS business committee. Because of his strict religious beliefs, Tappan opposed the participation of women in an official capacity in the public society.

Tappan founded the abolitionist Human Rights journal and a children's anti-slavery magazine, The Slave's Friend.

== Manual labor movement in education ==
"In July, 1831, Lewis Tappan, Gale, and others founded the Society for Promoting Manual Labor in Literary Institutions ["literary institutions" being schools], and later in the same year persuaded Theodore Weld, a living, breathing, and eloquently-speaking exhibit of the results of manual-labor-with-study, to accept the general agency." Manual labor—most commonly agricultural, or in a print shop—was supposed to bring students the physical and moral (psychological) benefits of exercise, while providing a type of financial aid to needy students. Among the charges to Weld, who in 1832 traveled over 4,500 miles (7,200 km) and gave over 200 lectures on manual labor and temperance, was "to find a site for a great national manual labor institution where training for the western ministry could be provided for poor but earnest young men." At the recommendation of Weld, the Tappans supported the new Lane Theological Seminary in Cincinnati. When Weld led a mass exodus to Oberlin, it then received their support.

== Amistad case ==
In 1841, the Amistad case went to trial. Tappan attended each day of the trials and wrote daily accounts of the proceedings for The Emancipator, a New England abolitionist paper. He was a frequent contributor. Throughout the trials in New Haven, Connecticut, Tappan arranged for several Yale University students to tutor the imprisoned African people in English. The lessons included their learning to read New Testament scriptures and to sing Christian hymns. The African people later drew from these skills to raise funds to return to Africa.

After achieving legal victory in the US Supreme Court, Tappan planned to use the Amistad Africans as the foundation for his dream to Christianize Africa. The village of Mo Tappan, site of a mission to the Mende people, in modern Sierra Leone, is named for him.

== Civil War years ==
In 1846, Tappan was among the founders of the American Missionary Association (AMA), led by Congregational and Presbyterian ministers, both white and black. It linked anti-slavery activists of the East with Ohio and other Midwestern activists. In addition, it took over managing numerous disparate missions: an Oberlin, Ohio mission to the Red Lake-area Ojibwe, a mission to Jamaica, a Mende mission to the Amistad Africans, and a mission to escaped black people living in Canada. As the AMA grew in influence, it expanded its enterprises. Among these, it began 115 anti-slavery Congregational churches in Illinois, aided by anti-slavery ministers such as Owen Lovejoy there.

In 1858, Tappan was the Treasurer of the AMA. Under the leadership of President Lawrence Brainerd, Tappan, Foreign Corresponding Secretary Rev. George Whipple, and Home Missions Corresponding Secretary Rev. S. S. Jocelyn, the AMA opposed the long-established and powerful American Board of Commissioners for Foreign Missions and American Home Missionary Society because of what the AMA alleged was their complicity with slavery. During and after the American Civil War, Tappan and his brother Arthur worked from New York with the AMA on behalf of freedmen in the South. In postwar efforts, it led the founding of numerous schools and colleges for freedmen, the historically black colleges and universities (HBCU).

Unwilling to reduce his commitment to U.S. government action against slavery in the southern states, Tappan and other radical political abolitionists denounced the Democratic Party as essentially pro-slavery. Though mistrustful of politicians, Tappan supported various antislavery parties that culminated in formation of the Republican Party. In both 1860 and 1864, Tappan voted for Abraham Lincoln.

Tappan supported the Emancipation Proclamation but believed that additional liberties were necessary. He wrote to Charles Sumner: "When will the poor negro have his rights? Not, I believe, until he has a musket in one hand and a ballot in the other."

== Philanthropy ==
Recipients of aid from Lewis Tappan included:

- American and Foreign Anti-Slavery Society
- American Anti-Slavery Society
- American Colonization Society
- American Missionary Association
- Human Rights (journal)
- Lane Seminary
- Oberlin College
- Oneida Institute
- Amistad defendants

== Legacy ==
In 2009 Tappan was inducted into the National Abolition Hall of Fame, in Peterboro, New York.

== Writings ==
- Tappan, Lewis (1828). Letter from a Gentleman in Boston to a Unitarian Clergyman of that City (2nd ed.). New York: T. R. Marvin, printer. "Lewis Tappan."
- Tappan, Lewis (1831). Letter to Eleazar Lord, Esq. in defence of measures for promoting the observance of the Christian Sabbath. New York.
- Tappan, Lewis (1839). Proceedings of the session of Broadway Tabernacle, against Lewis Tappan, with the action of the Presbytery and General Assembly. New York.
- Tappan, Lewis (1843). Address to the non-slaveholders of the South : on the social and political evils of slavery. Address to the non slaveholders of the South. New York: S.W. Benedict.
- Tappan, Lewis (1848). Letters respecting a book "dropped from the catalogue" of the American Sunday School Union, in compliance with the dictation of the slave power. New York: American and Foreign Anti-Slavery Society.
- Tappan, Lewis (1850). The Fugitive slave bill : its history and unconstitutionality : with an account of the seizure and enslavement of James Hamlet, and his subsequent restoration to liberty. New York: William Harned.
- Tappan, Lewis (1852). Reply to charges brought against the American and Foreign Anti-Slavery Society, &c., &c., &c. London. Archived from the original on August 10, 2024.
- Tappan, Lewis (1852). American slavery. New York. Archived from the original on August 11, 2024.
- Tappan, Lewis (1855). History of the American Missionary Association its constitution and principles, etc. New York.
- Tappan, Lewis (1861). The war: its cause and remedy. New York.
- Tappan, Lewis (1869). Is it right to be rich?. New York: Anson D, F. Randolph.
- Tappan, Lewis (1870). The Life of Arthur Tappan. New York: Hurd and Houghton. "Lewis Tappan."

== See also ==
- United States v. The Amistad, the United States Supreme Court case

== Sources ==
- Blue, Frederick J. No Taint of Compromise. Baton Rouge: Louisiana State University Press, 2006.
- Ceplair, Larry. The Public Years of Sarah and Angelina Grimke. New York: Columbia University Press, 1989.
- Harrold, Stanley. Subversives. Baton Rouge: Louisiana State University Press, 2003.
- Wyatt-Brown, Bertram. Lewis Tappan and the Evangelical War Against Slavery, New York: Athenaeum, 1971.
