= Peter Williams Jr. =

African-American Episcopal priest and abolitionist (1786–1840)

- Born: 1786; New Brunswick, New Jersey, U.S.
- Died: 1840 (aged 54)
- Education: African Free School
- Occupation: Priest
- Children: Amy Matilda Cassey
- Relatives: Joseph Cassey (son in-law), Peter William Cassey (grandson)

Peter Williams Jr. (1786–1840) was an African-American Episcopal priest, the second ordained in the United States and the first to serve in New York City. He was an abolitionist who also supported free black emigration to Haiti, the black republic that had achieved independence in 1804 in the Caribbean. In the 1820s and 1830s, he strongly opposed the American Colonization Society's efforts to relocate free blacks to the colony of Liberia in West Africa.

In 1808 he organized St. Philip's African Church in lower Manhattan, the second black Episcopal church in the United States. In 1827 he was a co-founder of Freedom's Journal, the first African-American owned and operated newspaper in the United States. In 1833, he co-founded the Phoenix Society, a mutual aid society for African Americans; that year he was also elected to the executive board of the interracial American Anti-Slavery Society.

== Early life and education ==
Williams was born in New Brunswick, New Jersey, the son of Peter Williams Sr., a Revolutionary War veteran, church sexton, and tobacconist; and his wife, Mary "Molly" Durham, an indentured servant from St. Kitts. After his family moved to New York City, Williams attended the African Free School, founded by the New York Manumission Society. He was also taught privately by Rev. Thomas Lyell, a prominent Episcopal priest.

In 1796, his father was among the organizers of the African Methodist Episcopal Zion Church (AME Zion) in New York. It developed as an independent black denomination, the second in the United States after the African Methodist Episcopal Church (AME), which was founded in Philadelphia. After the American Civil War, the AME Zion Church sent missionaries to the South and planted many congregations there among freedmen.

== Career ==
Williams gradually became active in the Episcopal Church, attending afternoon services at Trinity Church in Lower Manhattan together with other free blacks. Beginning in 1803, he was tutored by Rev. John Henry Hobart, assistant minister at Trinity. As a young man, Williams began to establish himself as a leader.

In 1808 he was chosen to give a speech on the first anniversary of the United States' abolition of the international slave trade; his talk was An Oration on the Abolition of the Slave Trade; Delivered in the African Church in the City of New-York, January 1, 1808. His speech was published as a pamphlet; it was one of the earliest publications by a black person about abolition.

In 1818, with the blessings of the prominent white Episcopal minister Rev. Thomas Lyell, Williams organized a black Episcopal congregation, which identified as St. Philip's African Church. The following year the congregation was recognized by the Episcopal Church; it was the second black Episcopal church to be founded in the US (the first was African Episcopal Church of St. Thomas, in Philadelphia). It was originally located in Lower Manhattan, where most of the black population was then concentrated. As blacks moved north, so did St. Philip's. Since the early 20th century it has been located in Harlem.

Williams believed that abolitionist societies would rescue freed African-Americans from the ‘evil consequences’ of slavery through 'example, the lessons of morality, industry and economy', that would one day create a world where ‘all the distinctions between the inalienable rights of black men, and white’ were gone. Williams continued in his leadership and was ordained as an Episcopal priest on July 10, 1826, the second in the United States and the first in New York. The following year, he was a co-founder of Freedom's Journal, the first black newspaper in the United States. He tutored promising students at the African Free School, including James McCune Smith, whom he aided to go to college and medical school in Scotland at the University of Glasgow. Smith returned to practice in New York as the first African-American doctor to be university-trained.

In 1833, Williams co-founded the Phoenix Society, a New York City mutual aid society for African Americans. That same year he joined the American Anti-Slavery Society and was selected as one of the African-American leaders on the executive board of the interracial group. However, his bishop requested that he resign from the society.

== Marriage and family ==
Rev. Hobart presided at the wedding of Williams and his wife. Of their children, one daughter, Amy Matilda Williams, survived to adulthood. She married wealthy black financier, Joseph Cassey of Philadelphia.

== See also ==
- Abolitionism in the United States
