= African Free School =

Charity, segregated school in New York City

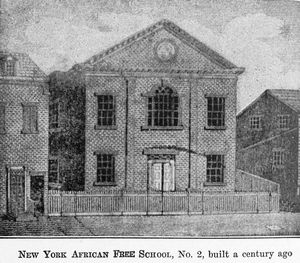
- Lithograph of second school, 1922, after an 1830 engraving from a drawing by student Patrick H. Reason

Location
- 40°43′07″N 73°59′52″W

Information
- Type: Charity, segregated
- Patron saint: New York Manumission Society
- Established: 1794
- Founder: John Jay; Alexander Hamilton
- Closed: 1835
- Head teacher: Charles Andrews (1809–1832)
- Last updated: 30 December 2017

The African Free School was a school for children of slaves and free people of color in New York City. It was founded by members of the New York Manumission Society, including Alexander Hamilton and John Jay, on November 2, 1787. Many of its alumni became leaders in the African-American community in New York.

== History ==
The school was founded by the New York Manumission Society, an organization that advocated the full abolition of African slavery. It was first located on Cliff Street (near Fulton Street). Other key locations included a major schoolhouse at 135-137 Mulberry Street, 245 William Street, and a later location at 120 West 3rd Street. In 1785, the group gained passage of a New York state law prohibiting the sale of slaves who were imported into the state. This preceded the 1808 federal law prohibiting importation of slaves into the United States. The New York law also eased restrictions on the manumission of enslaved Africans. The society's members were all white, male, wealthy, and influential. The society was founded by John Jay, a statesman and abolitionist, and included Alexander Hamilton among its members.

Established in 1794, the first school was a one-room schoolhouse that held about 40 students. Originally, the Manumission Society hired white teachers, but it eventually employed black teachers as well. It was an early form of "charity schooling," supported by donations for the city's poorest residents. In 1809, the school's trustees hired Charles C. Andrews, an English immigrant, to teach at the school. Andrews used the methods of Joseph Lancaster, a British school reformer whose system employed student assistants or "monitors," permitting a single teacher to conduct classes as large as several hundred. By all accounts, Andrews was passionately committed to the idea that his black students were just as bright as whites, if not even smarter. Under his leadership, the institution grew significantly, moving to a new building on William St in 1815. Five years later, an even bigger facility was opened on Mulberry Schoolhouse. By then, enrollment was approaching 700, and the schools were gaining a wide reputation for success. Andrews published a book in 1821 celebrating the schools' accomplishments, and they became a frequent stopping point for visitors to the city.

After opening yet another school, with enrollment surpassing a thousand children, a crisis unfolded in the early 1830s. Andrews publicly advocated the idea that American blacks should set up a colony in Africa, as was being done in Liberia by the American Colonization Society. This was one of the period's most controversial racial issues, as by this time most American blacks were native born and their goal was to achieve equal political rights in the United States. Black students boycotted the schools, leading to Andrews' dismissal in 1832. The administration hired black teachers to replace whites in each of the city's African Free Schools. By 1835, when the schools ended their run as privately supported institutions, the African Free School had seven buildings in different neighborhoods, and it had educated thousands of girls and boys. At that time, the African Free Schools and their facilities were integrated into the public school system. This was several years after New York freed the last adult slaves under its gradual abolition law.

The state had passed a gradual emancipation law in 1799: it provided that children of enslaved mothers would be born free, but were required to have lengthy periods as indentured servants, to 28 years of age for men and 25 for women, before being legally and socially free. Gradually, existing adult slaves were freed, until the last were freed in 1827.

== Notable alumni ==
- Ira Aldridge (1807–1867), actor and abolitionist activist
- Alexander Crummell (1819–1898), minister and early black nationalist
- Isaiah DeGrasse (1813–1841), minister and first African American alumnus of the University of Delaware
- George T. Downing (1819–1903), caterer and abolitionist
- Henry Highland Garnet (1815–1882), minister and abolitionist
- Jerome B. Peterson (1859–1943), newspaper owner and editor, civil servant, and diplomat
- Patrick H. Reason (1816–1898), printmaker, engraver
- Charles Lewis Reason (1818–1893), first African-American college professor, abolitionist
- James McCune Smith (1813–1870), the first African American to earn a medical degree; a physician, writer, and abolitionist.
- Samuel Ringgold Ward (1817–c.1866), journalist, abolitionist, minister; a cousin of Garnet
- Theodore S. Wright (1797–1847), minister and abolitionist

== See also ==
- New York Manumission Society
- African Free School alumni
- James McCune Smith
- Peter Williams Jr.
- Patrick H. Reason
- Abiel Smith School
- John Teasman

== Sources ==
- "Examination Days". New-York Historical Society.
- "Excerpt from the New York Commercial Advertiser, 1824". Skillman & Kirby Libraries, Lafayette College. Archived from the original on February 23, 2007.
- "Read AFS Bios". Examination Days The New York African Free School Collection. New-York Historical Society.
