= Arthur Tappan =

American abolitionist (1786–1865)

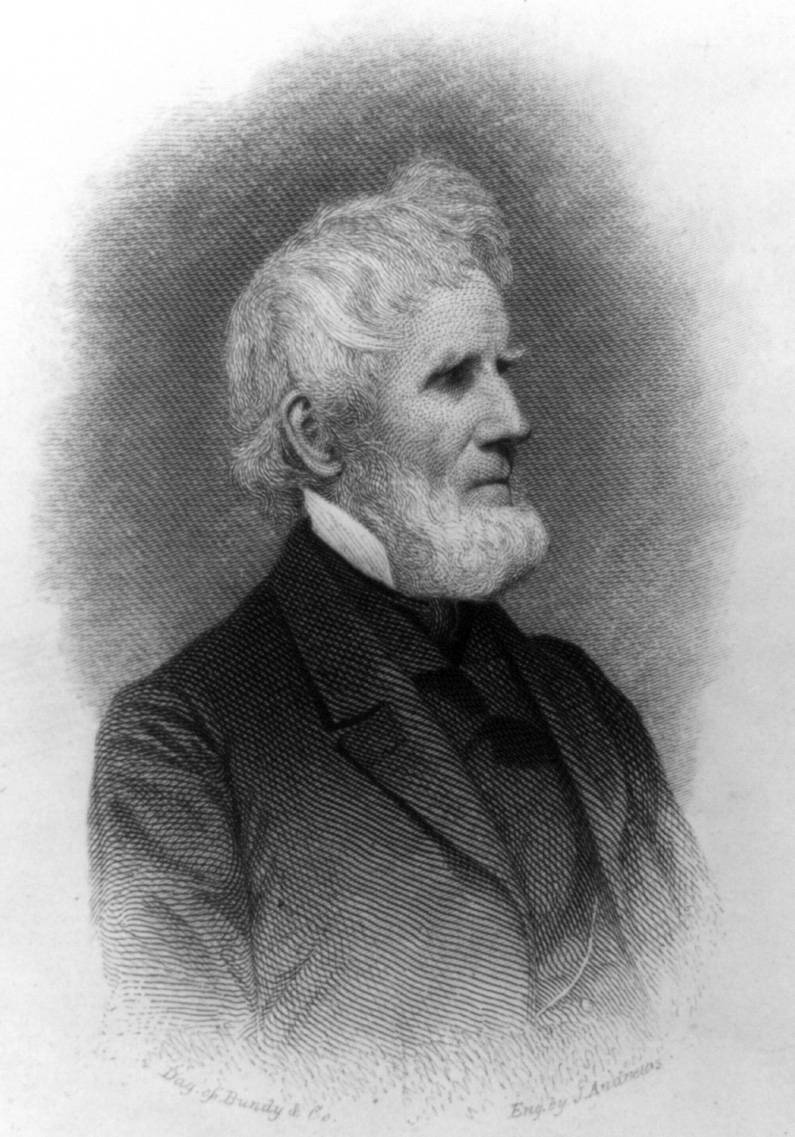
Portrait of Arthur Tappan from The Life of Arthur Tappan, by Lewis Tappan, New York, Hurd and Houghton, 1870.

Arthur Tappan (May 22, 1786 – July 23, 1865) was an American businessman, philanthropist and abolitionist. He was the brother of Ohio Senator Benjamin Tappan and abolitionist Lewis Tappan, and nephew of Harvard Divinity School theologian Rev. David Tappan.

He was a great-grandfather of Thornton Wilder.

== Biography ==
Arthur was born in Northampton, Massachusetts, to Benjamin Tappan (1747–1831) and Sarah Homes Tappan (1748–1826), the latter a great-niece of Benjamin Franklin. They were devout Christians and the family were brought up as Puritans. Tappan moved to Boston at the age of 15. In 1807 he established a dry goods business in Portland, Maine.

After his death, Arthur was described thus by his friend and educational collaborator Theodore Dwight Weld, who called him one of humanity's "great benefactors":

So simple in all his tastes and habits, so quiet and modest, yet so firm, independent, and conscientious, that nothing could swerve him from the right — so careful and deliberate in forming conclusions, yet instant and indomitable in executing. Economical in spending, yet always bountiful in giving. So faithful and true, so scrupulously just in all things. Never seeking his own; of few words, each straight to the point, and that a deed, and how often a great one; so earnest in daring for the weak against the strong.

In 1826, a year after the Erie Canal was completed, Arthur and his brother Lewis moved to New York City, the new national center of business and retail trade, where they established a silk importing business. In 1827 the brothers founded the New York Journal of Commerce with Samuel Morse.

Arthur and Lewis Tappan were successful businessmen, but commerce was never their foremost interest. They viewed making money as less important than saving souls. They made the Journal of Commerce a publication free of "immoral advertisements." Arthur Tappan's summer home in New Haven, Connecticut, was destroyed by a mob in 1831 (along with a black hotel and a black home) after his support for a surprisingly unpopular (New Haven Excitement) proposal of a college for African Americans in that city. (See Simeon Jocelyn.)

Both men suffered in the anti-abolitionist riots of 1834, in which mobs attacked their property. Arthur Tappan was one of two signatories who issued a disclaimer on behalf of the American Anti-Slavery Society, of which he was president, in the aftermath of the riots, emphasising its dedication to abolishing slavery within the existing laws of the United States.

"In the great commercial crisis of 1837 he suffered immense losses; and not long after turned his attention to other and more retired occupations, by which he obtained a comfortable subsistence for his family, and the ability still to contribute, though on a greatly diminished scale, throughout his protracted life." Their philanthropic efforts crippled and pledges not met, the Tappans were forced to close their silk-importing business, and almost their paper, but the brothers persevered. In the 1840s, they founded another lucrative business enterprise when they opened the first commercial credit-rating service, the Mercantile Agency, a predecessor of Dun & Bradstreet.

== Philanthropic and abolitionist activity ==
The Tappan brothers made their mark in commerce and in abolitionism. Throughout their careers, the Tappans devoted time and money to philanthropic causes as diverse as temperance, the abolition of slavery, and their support of new colleges in what was then the west of the country: successively, the Oneida Institute, Lane Theological Seminary, the Lane Rebels at Cumminsville, Ohio, and Oberlin Collegiate Institute. Their beliefs about observing Sabbath extended to campaigns against providing stagecoach service and mail deliveries on Sundays.

In 1833, while a principal owner of the Journal of Commerce, Arthur Tappan allied with William Lloyd Garrison and co-founded the American Anti-Slavery Society. Arthur served as its first president, and there was in 1835 a reward of $20,000 (equivalent to $624,194 in 2025) for his capture and delivery to New Orleans.

He resigned in 1840 because of his opposition to the society's new support of women's suffrage and feminism. Their early support for Oberlin College, a center of abolitionist activity, included $10,000 to build Tappan Hall. Oberlin's green Tappan Square now occupies the site.

Continuing their support for abolition, Arthur and his brother founded the American and Foreign Anti-Slavery Society in 1840 and the American Missionary Association in 1846. After the Fugitive Slave Law of 1850 was passed, Tappan refused to comply with the new law and donated money to the Underground Railroad. The brothers' positions on the slavery issue were not universally popular. In early July 1834, Lewis Tappan's New York home was sacked by a mob, who threw his furniture into the street and burned it.

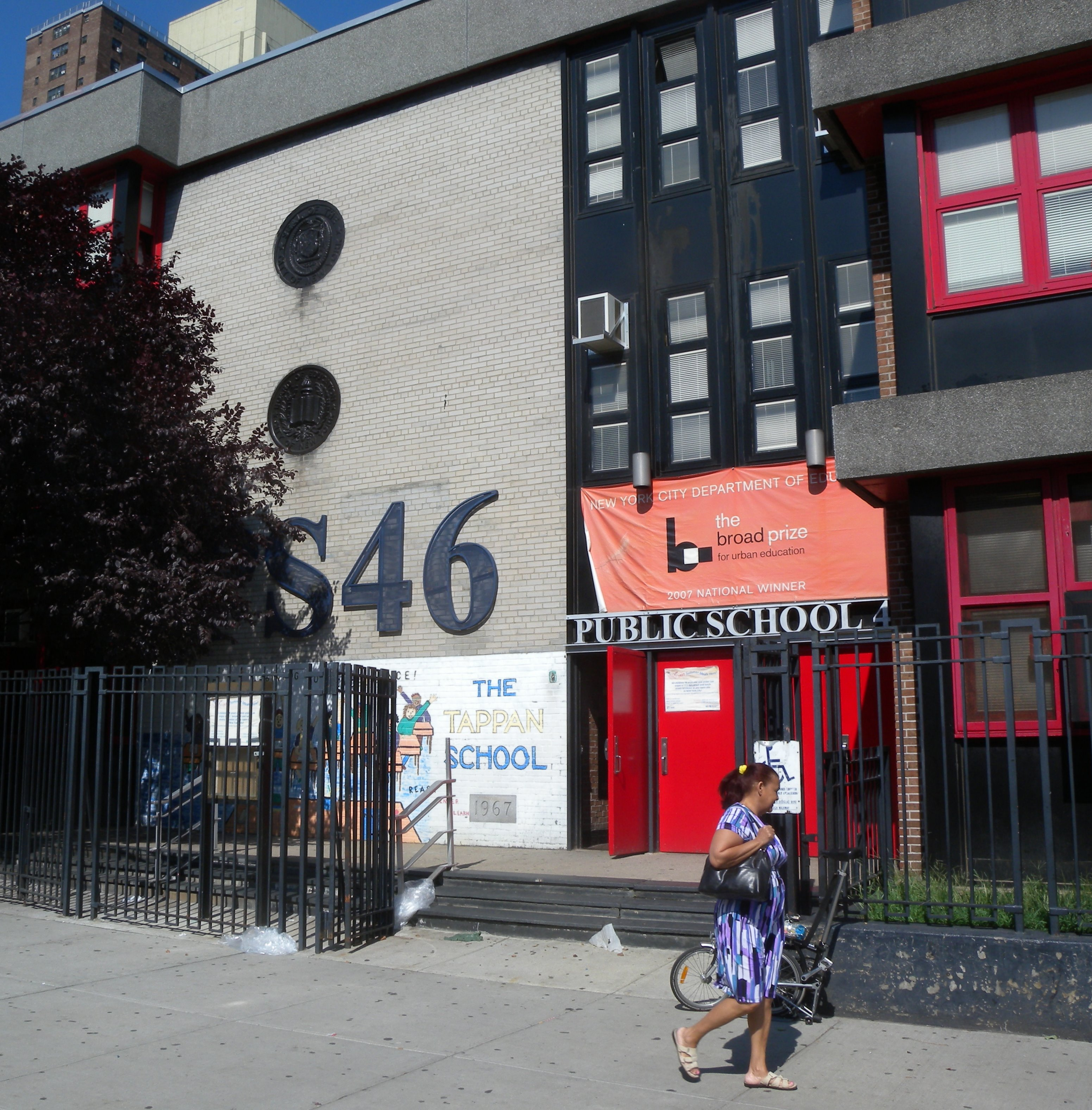
Arthur Tappan School, Harlem

The Tappans and the Journal of Commerce attracted bitter criticism for their campaign to free the Africans who had taken over the slave ship Amistad in 1839. James Gordon Bennett, Sr.’s rival New York Morning Herald denounced “"the humbug doctrines of the abolitionists and the miserable fanatics who propagate them," particularly Lewis Tappan and the Journal of Commerce.

Arthur Tappan died in 1865, Lewis in 1873. Both men lived long enough to see the Emancipation Proclamation and the Thirteenth Amendment eliminate slavery in the United States, granting freedom to millions of African Americans. Arthur is buried in the Grove Street Cemetery, New Haven.

== Writings ==
- Tappan, Arthur (1834). Address to the people of color in the City of New York. By members of the Executive Committee of the American Anti-Slavery Society. New York. Archived from the original on September 19, 2023.
- Tappan, Arthur (1848). Address to the friends of liberty. New York: American and Foreign Anti-Slavery Society.

== See also ==
- List of opponents of slavery
