= American Anti-Slavery Society =

Abolitionist society in existence from 1833–1870

- Abbreviation: AASS
- Founded: December 4, 1833; 192 years ago
- Dissolved: 1870; 156 years ago
- Succeeded by: American and Foreign Anti-Slavery Society (1840); Liberty Party (1840)
- Headquarters: New York City
- Newspaper: National Anti-Slavery Standard (1840–1870)
- Ideology: Abolitionism

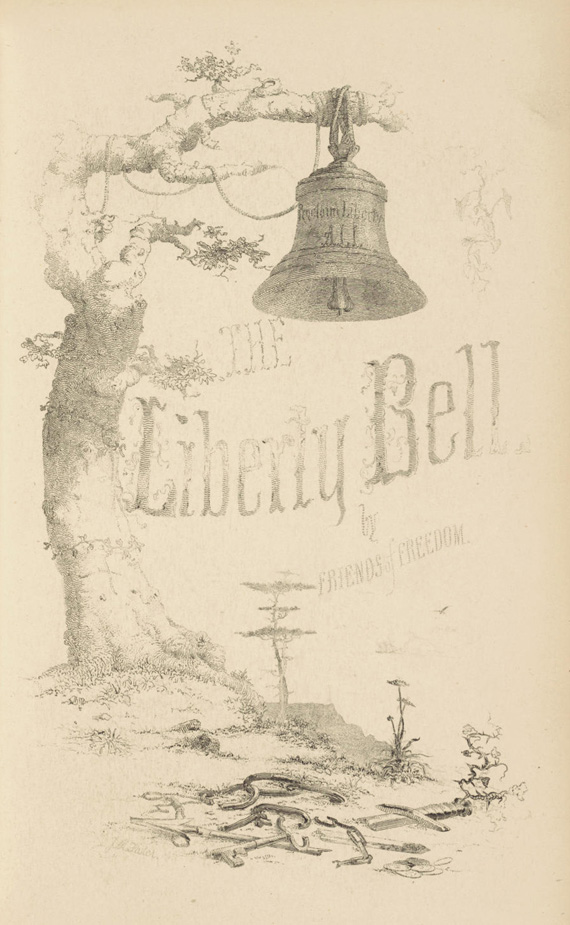
The Liberty Bell. Boston: American Anti-Slavery Society, 1856. Division of Rare & Manuscript Collections. Carl A. Kroch Library, Cornell University.

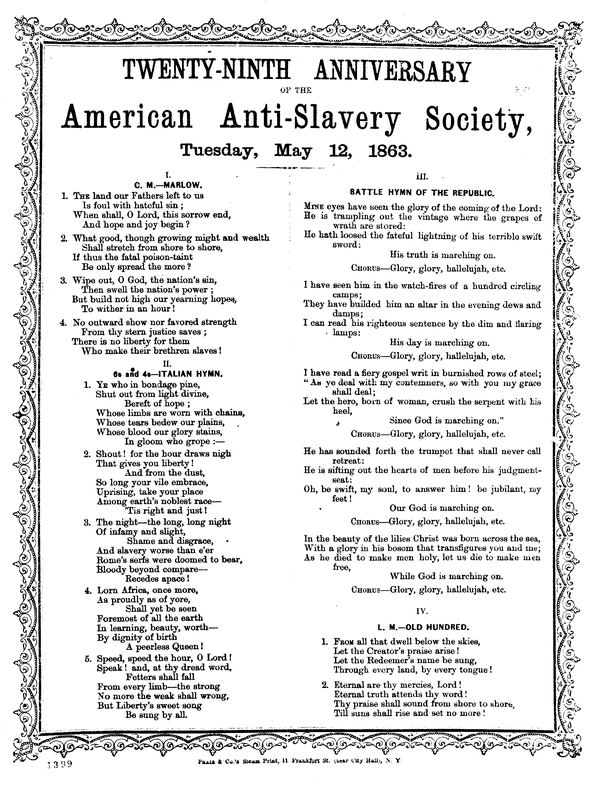
Program for the 29th anniversary of the Anti-Slavery Society

The American Anti-Slavery Society (AASS) was an abolitionist society in the United States. AASS formed in 1833 in response to the nullification crisis and the failures of existing anti-slavery organizations, such as the American Colonization Society. AASS formally dissolved in 1870.

AASS was founded by William Lloyd Garrison and Arthur Tappan. Frederick Douglass, an escaped slave, had become a prominent abolitionist and was a key leader in AASS, who often spoke at its meetings. William Wells Brown, also a freedman, also often spoke at meetings. By 1838, AASS had 1,346 local chapters. In 1840, AASS claimed about 200,000 members.

Prominent members included Susan B. Anthony, Elizabeth Cady Stanton, Theodore Dwight Weld, Lewis Tappan, James G. Birney, Lydia Maria Child, Maria Weston Chapman, Nathan Lord, Augustine Clarke, Theodore S. Wright, Samuel Cornish, George T. Downing, James Forten, Abby Kelley Foster, Stephen Symonds Foster, Henry Highland Garnet, Beriah Green, Lucretia Mott, Wendell Phillips, Robert Purvis, Charles Lenox Remond, Sarah Parker Remond, Lucy Stone, and John Greenleaf Whittier, among others.

== History ==
=== Background ===
By the 1820s, the controversy surrounding the Missouri Compromise had quieted considerably but was revived by a series of events, near the end of the decade. Serious debates over abolition took place in the Virginia legislature in 1829 and 1831. (See Thomas Roderick Dew#Pro-slavery advocate.) In the North, discussion began about the possibility of freeing slaves and "resettling" them in Africa (a proposal that, under the auspices of the American Colonization Society, led to the founding of Liberia).

Agitation increased with the publication of David Walker's Appeal to the Colored Citizens of the World in 1829, Nat Turner's slave rebellion in 1831, and Andrew Jackson's handling of the nullification crisis that same year. According to Louis Ruchame,

The Turner rebellion was only one of about 200 slave uprisings between 1776 and 1860, but it was one of the bloodiest, and thus struck fear in the hearts of many white southerners. Nat Turner and more than 70 enslaved and free blacks spontaneously launched a rebellion in Southampton County, Virginia, in August 1831. They moved from farm to farm, indiscriminately killing whites along the way and picking up additional slaves. By the time the militia put down the insurrection, more than 80 slaves had joined the rebellion, and 60 whites lay dead. While the uprising led some Southerners to consider abolition, the reaction in all Southern states was to tighten the laws governing slave behavior.

That same year, South Carolina's opposition to the federal tariff led the legislature to declare that the law was null and void in the state, and the state's leaders spoke of using the militia to prevent federal customs agents from collecting the tax. President Andrew Jackson swept aside the states' rights arguments and threatened to use the army to enforce federal laws. In the face of Jackson's determination, the state backed down, but the episode raised fears throughout the South that it was only a matter of time before Congress would begin to tamper with slavery. Southern anxiety increased in 1833 with the founding of the American Anti-Slavery Society in Louisiana.

Beginning in 1816, the American Colonization Society became the early antebellum locus of anti-slavery activity, presided over by James Madison in his last three years of life (until 1836). In 1789, Madison had expressed his belief that blacks and whites could not integrate into society together, and proposed a policy of separation. Madison argued that integration (at the time called "amalgamation") was impossible, because there would always be oppression, hatred, and hostility between former slaves and former slave holders. He also claimed, in his so-called "Memorandum on an African Colony for Freed Slaves", that "freedmen retained the vices and habits of slaves." He advocated "resettlement" of former slaves to the west coast of Africa, where the Society acquired land and founded what became Liberia.

The ACS idea of colonization stemmed from immediate abolition bills proposed to the Federal Congress. In 1791, Madison had observed that, in his experience, such proposals resulted in "harm rather than good." During the Second Federal Congress, Madison corresponded with manumitter Robert Pleasants, confirming their mutual support for conscientious religious objection to a Virginia state militia, premised on the First Amendment to the United States Constitution. The correspondence belied arguments that Madison completely capitulated to Virginia Antifederalist demands for an individual and state "right" to organize militias, in what would become the Second Amendment. The scope of the Amendment potentially included slave patrols, stemming from Madison's attempts to ameliorate Antifederal proponents of state police powers in the Virginia ratification convention. Scholarly attempts to establish such a Second Amendment "original intent" have been roundly criticized because of, at best, "circumstantial" evidence. Another principal concern is the dismissal of additional intentions and considerations, including finalization of Second Amendment semantics by federal Senators, not Madison in the House of Representatives. As of September 2024, according to one historian of the politics of chattel slavery and gun control, a "comprehensive treatment that can handle slavery, arms, constitutionalism, and the rest of political culture is still needed."

In perusing the correspondence with Pleasants, later ACS members heeded Madison's warning that immediate abolition proposals could lead to protracted Congressional debates. Lengthy deliberations and Congressional sessions, in turn, allowed proslavery delegates sufficient time to propose the repeal of individual manumission codes in the several states, ostensibly in anticipation of federal abolition. A corollary to this concern was that proslavery delegates, in the context of individual manumission codes, had hitherto demanded "a condition that the persons freed should be removed from the Country." For Madison, federal colonization legislation proved more prudent, practical, and feasible because proslavery representatives were already amenable to it. Madisonian colonization would ultimately be compulsory, not voluntary, which again aligned with ACS goals.

=== Origins ===
A convention of abolitionists was called for December 4, 1833, at the Adelphi Building in Philadelphia. The convention had 62 delegates, of which 21 were Quakers. At this point, the American Anti-Slavery Society formed to appeal to the moral and practical circumstances that, at this point, propped up a pro-slavery society. Between December 4–6, 1833, sixty delegates from New England, Pennsylvania, Ohio, New York, and New Jersey convened a National Anti-Slavery Convention in Philadelphia. Beriah Green presided over the Convention — no one else was willing to—, with Lewis Tappan and John Greenleaf Whittier serving as secretaries. One Convention committee drafted an American Anti-Slavery Society Constitution and Declaration of Sentiments. The principal author of both was the publisher of the fledgling Boston-based Liberator, William Lloyd Garrison.

The new American Anti-Slavery Society charged William Lloyd Garrison with writing the organization's new declaration. The document condemns the institution of slavery and accuses slave owners of the sin of being a "man-stealer". It calls for the immediate abolition of slavery without conditions, and is critical of the efforts of the American Colonization Society. At the same time, it declares the group to be pacifist, and the signers agree, if necessary, to die as martyrs.

Beginning in January 1834 and ending in August of the same year, the society published the American Anti-Slavery Reporter, a monthly periodical containing professional essays regarding the subject of slavery.

=== Early history ===
The society was considered controversial and its activities were sometimes met with violence. According to the Encyclopedia Britannica, "The society's antislavery activities frequently met with violent public opposition, with mobs invading meetings, attacking speakers, and burning presses."

In July 1834 the aims of the society appear to have been misrepresented in the prelude to the Farren Riots in New York, which resulted in attacks on the homes and properties of abolitionists. After the riots were quelled, the society issued a public disclaimer:

The undersigned, in behalf of the Executive Committee of the 'American Anti-Slavery Society' and of other leading friends of the cause, now absent from the city, beg the attention of their fellow-citizens to the following disclaimer:— 1. We entirely disclaim any desire to promote or encourage intermarriages between white and coloured persons. 2. We disclaim and entirely disapprove the language of a handbill recently circulated in this city, the tendency of which is thought to be to excite resistance to the laws. Our principle is, that even hard laws are to be submitted to by all men, until they can by peaceable means be altered. We disclaim, as we have already done, any intention to dissolve the Union, or to violate the constitution and laws of the country, or to ask of Congress any act transcending their constitutional powers, which the abolition of slavery by Congress in any state would plainly do. July 12, 1834. ARTHUR TAPPAN. JOHN RANKIN

The black clergyman Theodore S. Wright was a significant founding member and served on the executive committee until 1840. A Presbyterian minister, Wright, together with well-known spokesmen such as Tappan and Garrison, agitated for temperance, education, black suffrage, and land reform.

According to Wright:

I will say nothing about the inconvenience which I have experienced myself, and which every man of color experiences, though made in the image of God. I will say nothing about the inconvenience of traveling; how we are frowned upon and despised. No matter how we may demean ourselves, we find embarrassments everywhere. But, this prejudice goes farther. It debars men from heaven. While sir, slavery cuts off the colored portion of the community from religious privileges men are made infidels. What, they demand, is your Christianity? How do you regard your brethren? How do you treat them at the Lord's table? Where is your consistency in talking about the heathen, traversing the ocean to circulate the Bible everywhere, while you frown upon them at the door? These things meet us and weigh down our spirits....

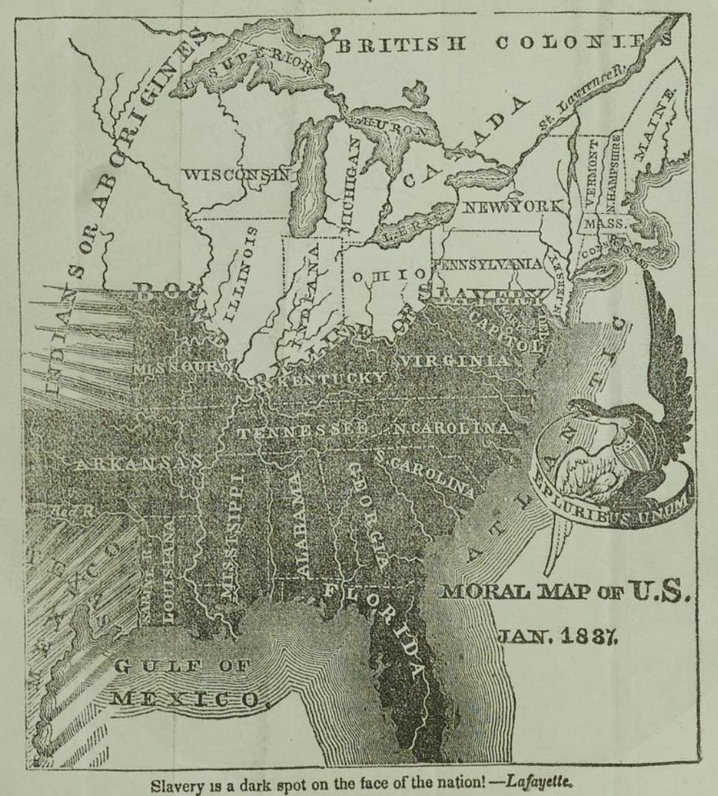
The Moral Map of the U.S., from the AASS publication The Legion of Liberty! and Force of Truth

Many founding members used a practical approach to slavery, saying economically it did not make sense. Wright used the rhetoric of religion to elicit empathy toward African Americans, and presented slavery as a moral sin.

Frederick Douglass had seen the frustration that Garrison felt toward those who disagreed with him, but wrote many letters to Garrison describing to him the details of the prejudices that slavery had caused. One in particular was directed toward the church. According to Douglass:

In the South I was a member of the Methodist Church. When I came north, I thought one Sunday I would attend communion, at one of the churches of my denomination, in the town I was staying. The white people gathered round the altar, the blacks clustered by the door. After the good minister had served out the bread and wine to one portion of those near him, he said, "These may withdraw, and others come forward"; thus he proceeded till all the white members had been served. Then he drew a long breath, and looking out towards the door, exclaimed, "Come up, colored friends, come up! for you know God is no respecter of persons!" I haven't been there to see the sacraments taken since.

Douglass hoped his letters would remind Garrison why slavery should be abolished. Douglass's reminder did not ease the minds of those against Garrison.

=== 1840 World Anti-Slavery Convention ===
In 1840, the American Anti-Slavery Society was invited to the World Anti-Slavery Convention in London, England, to meet and network with other abolitionists of the time. Additionally, it served to strengthen each group's commitment to racial equality. At this convention, female delegates were not allowed to participate in the event, but rather observe only, from a gallery.

The ruling to exclude female abolitionists caused feminists Lucretia Mott and Elizabeth Cady Stanton to form a group for women's rights, though it garnered little success initially. Garrison arrived to the convention late and, upon hearing of the decision not to allow women to participate, he chose not to enter the Convention. He viewed the proceedings with the women in the gallery. This became the genesis for the women's suffrage movement.

=== 1839–1840 split ===
From the beginning, women held a marginal role in the organization. Only white women were invited to the original 1833 gathering of the organization, and even they were not allowed to participate in an active role. Lucretia Mott, Lydia White, Esther Moore, and Sidney Ann Lewis attended on December 4, 1833, but none were able to sign the Constitution that day. Their exclusion from this convention contributed to female-led organizations that formed shortly thereafter.

In the western United States, women held more important roles in the American Anti-slavery Society. Attitudes of equalitarianism were more widely accepted and women were viewed as "coworkers, not subordinates". Women not only held leadership positions, but also attended various societies and conventions. In contrast, women's participation in the American Anti-slavery Society became a quite contentious issue in the eastern United States. Women who were publicly passionate about abolition were seen as fanatics.

In 1839, the national organization split over basic differences of approach: Garrison and his followers were more radical than other members. They denounced the U.S. Constitution as supportive of slavery, were against established religion, and insisted on sharing organizational responsibility with women. Disagreement regarding the formal involvement of women became one of the principal factors which contributed to the dissolution of the organization. Another issue was whether abolitionists should enter politics as a distinct party.

==== Anti-feminist split ====
One of the more irreconcilable differences between the two internal AASS factions resulted in an external rivalry between dual anti-slavery societies. A minority of anti-feminist delegates left the AASS, forming the American and Foreign Anti-Slavery Society. Wright was among them. They were more conservative, supporting organized religion and traditional forms of governance, and excluding women from leadership. Recent studies examine remaining AAAS members who sympathized with the AFASS. Their rejoinders, rebuttals, and dialectics, proffered within AASS meetings and in the pages of The Liberator, framed arguments and ideas later appropriated by male and female anti-suffragists, the Liberal Republicans, and northeastern supporters for the Compromise of 1877. The progenitors of such ideas frequently shifted positions and retracted statements in the postbellum era, often to no avail.

==== Liberty Party ====
Along with differing opinions about the role of women, the Liberty Party emerged as a separate anti-slavery organization that broke away from the American Anti-Slavery Society in 1839 in order to pursue an abolitionist agenda through the political process. As a radical, Garrison did not believe it prudent to fight the system from the inside. Because women in the West had a more fluid approach to their political involvement, particularly when it came to Garrison's staunch disagreement with the Constitution, they were drawn to supporting the Liberty Party. The disruption of the American Anti-Slavery Society, however, caused little damage to abolitionism.

At the annual Society meeting in New York, on May 12, 1840, the first item of business was the appointment of a Committee of Business. Eleven people were chosen, with William Garrison the chairman. One of them was a woman, Abby Kelley. "The vote appointing Miss Kelley being doubted, the house was divided, and on a count there appeared 557 in favor and 451 against her election. Lewis Tappan, Amos A. Phelps, and Charles W. Denison successively asked to be excused from serving on the committee, for reasons assigned; having reference to the appointment of Miss Kelly as a member. They were excused."

=== Decline and dissolution ===
After the AASS schism in national leadership, the bulk of AASS activity in the 1840s and 1850s was carried on by state and local societies.

The antislavery issue entered the mainstream of American politics through the Free Soil Party (1848–1854) and subsequently the Republican Party (founded in 1854).

In 1870, the American Anti-Slavery Society was formally dissolved, after the Civil War, Emancipation, and the 13th Amendment, 14th Amendment, and 15th Amendment to the U.S. Constitution legally ended slavery, extended citizenship to all formerly enslaved people born in the U.S., and barred restricting voting rights on account of race or past enslavement.

== Leadership ==
The inaugural Executive Committee of the American Anti-Slavery Society included Arthur Tappan (President), Abraham L. Cox (Recording Secretary), William Greene (Treasurer), Elizur Wright (Secretary of Domestic Correspondence), and William Lloyd Garrison (Secretary of the Foreign Correspondence).

William Lloyd Garrison was one of the original founders of the American Anti-Slavery Society in 1833. Two years before founding the Society, Garrison began publishing The Liberator. This abolitionist paper argued for the immediate freedom of all slaves and operated under the motto of "Our country is the world – our countrymen are mankind." Within two years of the 1840 Society schism over the appointment of Abby Kelley to the Society business committee and efforts to wed abolition with first-wave feminism (and, to a lesser extent, over the roles of African-American leaders), the former Society President, his brother, and their adherents had seceded from the American Anti-Slavery Society. These men subsequently established the rival American and Foreign Anti-Slavery Society. Six African-American men also apostatized to the oppositional Society, principally due to a potential conflation of female leadership with white feminism in the American Anti-Slavery Society. The formation of the National Woman Suffrage Association and ethno-racial "lower orders" arguments by Elizabeth Cady Stanton in her weekly The Revolution substantiated these fears, to a certain degree, for a number of these men.

Frederick Douglass was one of the black activists who joined the American Anti-Slavery Society shortly after the internal schism and appointment of Garrison as Society President. Douglass was active within the Massachusetts Anti-Slavery Society between 1841 and 1842. He engaged with the American Anti-Slavery Society lecture circuit beginning 1843. Born into chattel slavery, Douglass escaped and made his way to New Bedford, Boston, and New York. He developed written and verbal skills that resulted in his becoming a prominent spokesman of the abolitionist movement. He endorsed a federal women's suffrage resolution at the Seneca Falls Convention as well. During Reconstruction, Douglass retracted support for the inclusion of women in the Fifteenth Amendment to the United States Constitution, fearing that a female suffrage clause would preclude ratification in several states.

Francis Jackson, grandfather of John Brown's raider Francis Jackson Meriam, was a president of the Society.

== Publications ==
According to the Encyclopedia of Slavery and Abolition in the United States, Weld held the positions of Manager, 1833–1835, and Corresponding Secretary, 1839–1840. Appletons' Cyclopædia of American Biography states that "in 1836 he ... was appointed by the American Anti-slavery Society editor of its books and pamphlets."

- Thome, James A. (1838). Emancipation in the West Indies.: a six months' tour in Antigua, Barbadoes, and Jamaica, in the year 1837. New York: American Anti-Slavery Society.
- In 1839 the Society published American Slavery as It Is: Testimony of a Thousand Witnesses, by Theodore D. Weld, his wife Angelina Grimké, and her sister Sarah Grimké. In the book, the Society's address is given as 143 Nassau Street, New York. Mail for Theodore Weld could be sent there. This book is the most extensive antislavery book, later becoming inspiration for Harriet Beecher Stowe's Uncle Tom's Cabin. In it, Weld writes about the horrors of slavery through graphic descriptions of mistreatment of slaves, including their living conditions, food, and from first-hand accounts. See Treatment of slaves in the United States#American Slavery As It Is (1839).
- The Liberty Bell, published together with the Boston Female Anti-Slavery Society.
- The Legion of Liberty! and Force of Truth, a publication containing the thoughts, words and deeds of some prominent abolitionists.

== See also ==
- African American founding fathers of the United States
- The Slave's Friend
