= American Anti-Slavery Almanac =

Abolitionist periodical (1836–1843)

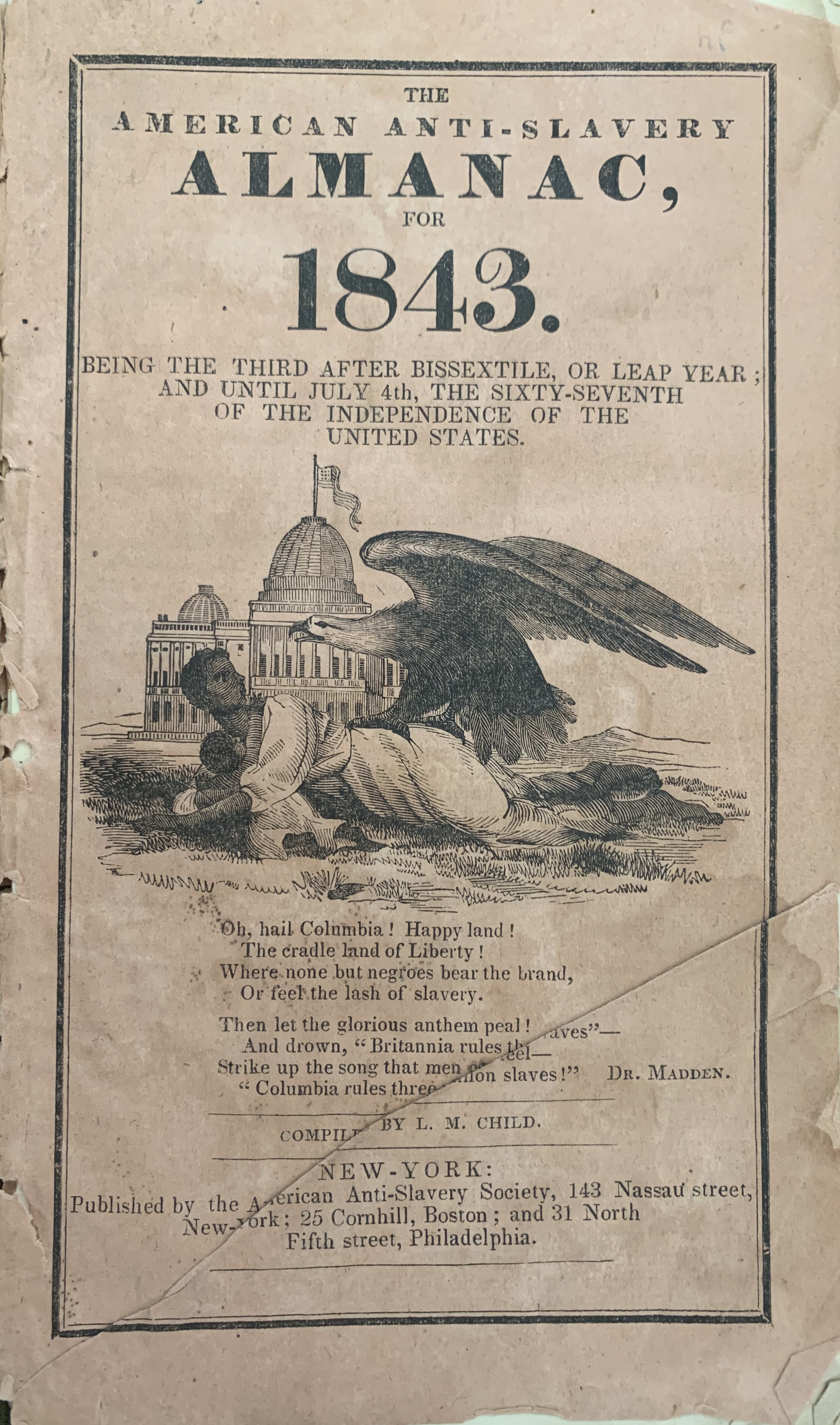
Original cover for the 1843 edition, compiled by Lydia Maria Child

The American Anti-Slavery Almanac was an abolitionist publication published yearly from 1836 to 1843 by the American Anti-Slavery Society, as one of the society's efforts to raise awareness of the realities of slavery in nineteenth-century America. The yearly almanac compiled calendars and astronomical data with anti-slavery literature, art, and advertisements in a small, neat pamphlet. The 1843 edition included works from authors such as William Lloyd Garrison and Thomas Moore, as well as accounts of recent slave rebellions and quotes from political speeches supporting the abolition of slavery. The almanac did not call for uprising or violence, but rather served as a means to spread the word about the anti-slavery cause.

== Editions ==
The almanac had different editors and publishers under the American Anti-Slavery Society, depending on the edition and the publication location. The authors were part of the society, such as Lydia Maria Child, an abolitionist and women's rights advocate who served on the American Anti-Slavery society board during the 1840s and 1850s. She compiled the American Anti-Slavery Almanac for 1843, which includes a page on the National Anti-Slavery Standard, a publication she also edited. Other authors include Isaac Knapp (1838, Boston) and S. W Benedict (1842, Boston).

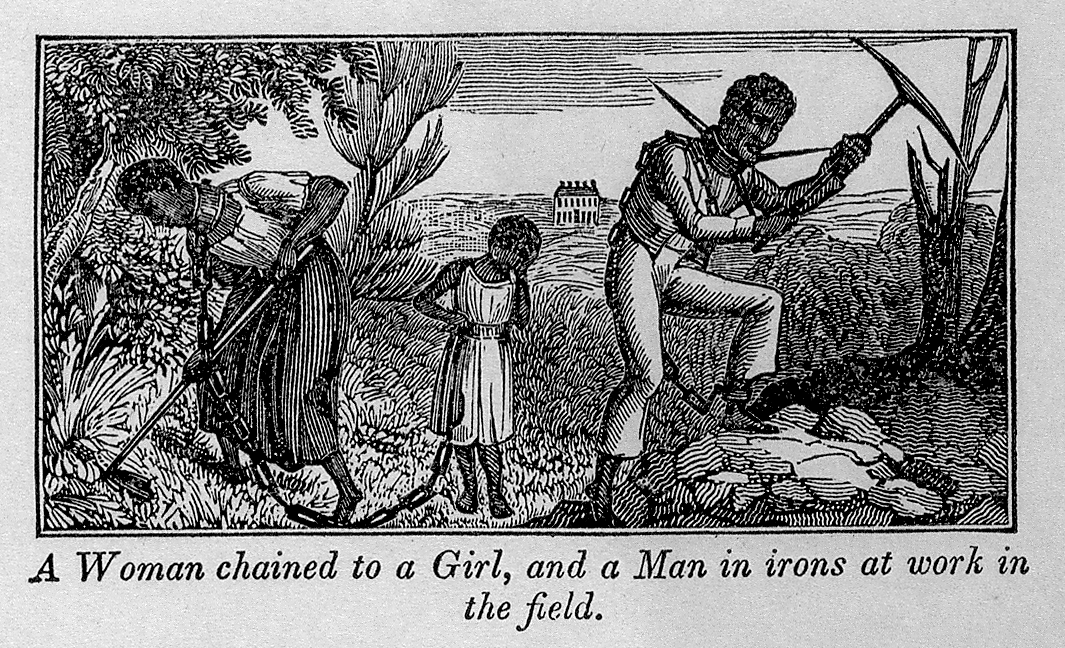
Graphic from the almanac, 1840

=== 1836 ===
The 1836 edition of the almanac was published in Boston, Massachusetts by Webster & Southard.

=== 1837 ===
The 1837 edition was published in Cincinnati, Ohio by the Ohio Anti-Slavery Society.

=== 1838 ===
The 1838 edition was published in Boston by Isaac Knapp, who partnered with William Lloyd Garrison to publish the Liberator, an abolitionist newspaper.

=== 1839 ===
The 1839 edition was published in New York, New York and Boston by Isaac Knapp and S.W. Benedict.

=== 1840 ===
The 1840 edition was published in New York City and Boston by the American Anti-Slavery Society.

=== 1842 ===
The 1842 edition was published in Boston by S.W. Benedict.

=== 1843 ===
The 1843 edition was published in New York City, compiled by Lydia Maria Child.

== Publishing ==
The almanac was published by the American Anti-Slavery Society, which also published the weekly newspaper, the National Anti-Slavery Standard. Some of the publication locations include New York, Philadelphia, and Boston. There was also a 1837 edition published in Cincinnati, Ohio.
