= List of publications of William Garrison and Isaac Knapp =

In the 1830s, in addition to the newspaper The Liberator, the Boston-based abolitionists William Garrison and Isaac Knapp printed and/or published a number of anti-slavery pamphlets and books. The statements "printed by" and "published by" are in most cases taken from the books or pamphlets themselves. For the others, in which information is taken from library catalogs, a link to the catalog entry is provided.

== 1831 ==
- Day, Thomas (1831). Fragment of an original letter on the slavery of the negroes : written in the year 1776. Boston: Re-printed by Garrison and Knapp.
- Rushton, Edward (1831). Expostulatory letter to George Washington. Boston: Garrison & Knapp, printers.

== 1832 ==
- Garrison, Wm. Lloyd (1832). An Address on the progress of the abolition cause : delivered before the African Abolition Freehold Society of Boston, July 16, 1832. Boston: Printed by Garrison and Knapp.
- May, Samuel J. (1832). A discourse on slavery in the United States, delivered in Brooklyn [Connecticut], July 3, 1831. Boston: Published by Garrison and Knapp.
- Young Men's Temperance Society (1832). Address of the Young Men's Temperance Society to the young men of Boston: To which is annexed the Constitution of the Society. Address to the young men of Boston. Boston: Printed by Garrison and Knapp. OCLC 1037484576.
- New England Anti-Slavery Society (1832). Constitution of the New-England Anti-Slavery Society : together with its by-laws, and a list of its officers. Boston: Garrison and Knapp, printers.
- New England Anti-Slavery Society; Buffum, Arnold (1832). Constitution of the New-England Anti-Slavery Society : with an address to the public. Printed by Garrison and Knapp.
- Garrison, Wm. Lloyd (1832). Thoughts on African colonization : or an impartial exhibition of the doctrines, principles and purposes of the American Colonization Society. Together with the resolutions, addresses and remonstrances of the free people of color. Printed and published by Garrison and Knapp.
- Stewart, Maria W. (1832). Meditations from the pen of Mrs. Maria W. Stewart : presented to the First African Baptist Church and Society, in the city of Boston. Printed by Garrison and Knapp. OCLC 122552887.
- Garrison, Wm. Lloyd (1832). Prospectus of the Liberator, volume III. Boston: Printed by Garrison and Knapp. OCLC 81063440.
- Buffum, Arnold; Coffin, Joshua; Garrison, Wm. Lloyd (1832). Proposals for establishing a school on the manual labor system for the education of colored youth. Boston: New England Anti-Slavery Society [Printed by Garrison and Knapp?]. OCLC 64736473.

== 1833 ==
- Rankin, Rev. John (1833). Letters on slavery addressed to Mr. Thomas Rankin, merchant at Middlebrook, Augusta County, Va. Boston: Published by Garrison and Knapp.
- New-England Anti-slavery Society (1833). The Abolitionist, or Record of the New-England Anti-slavery Society. Printed by Garrison and Knapp.
- Cropper, James; Garrison, William; Paul, Rev. Nathaniel; O'Connell, Daniel; Mr. Buckingham; Mr. Hunt; Rev. Mr. Abrahams; Thompson, George (1833). Speeches delivered at the Anti-Colonization Meeting : in Exeter Hall, London, July 13, 1833. Preface and footnotes by Garrison. "British protest" against the American Colonization Society — p. [1] signed by Wm. Wilberforce and 11 others. Prospectus for "Thoughts on African colonization" (new ed.) by Garrison--p. [3]. Boston: Printed by Garrison & Knapp. OCLC 85796677.
- New England Anti-Slavery Society (1833). First annual report of the Board of Managers of the New-England Anti-Slavery Society : presented Jan. 9, 1833 : with an appendix. Boston: Printed by Garrison and Knapp.
- British opinions of the American Colonization Society. Boston. Printed by Garrison & Knapp. 1833.

== 1834 ==
- New-England Anti-Slavery Society (1834). Second annual report of the board of managers of the New-England Anti-Slavery Society : presented Jan. 15, 1834 : with an appendix. Boston: Printed by Garrison & Knapp.
- New England Anti-Slavery Convention (1834). Proceedings of the New-England Anti-Slavery Convention, held in Boston on the 27th, 28th and 29th of May, 1834. Boston: Published by Garrison & Knapp.
- Garrison, William, ed. (1834). A selection of anti-slavery hymns, : for the use of the friends of emancipation. Published by Garrison and Knapp.
- Phelps, Amos A. (1834). Lectures on slavery and its remedy. Boston: New-England Anti-Slavery Society. Garrison & Knapp, printers.
- Bourne, Rev. George (1834). Man-stealing and slavery denounced by the Presbyterian and Methodist churches. Boston: Published by Garrison & Knapp.
- Lowell, Laura H. (attrib.) (1838). Report of a delegate to the Anti-Slavery Convention of American Women : held in Philadelphia, May, 1838; including an account of other meetings held in Pennsylvania Hall, and of the riot : addressed to the Fall River Female Anti-Slavery Society, and published by its request. Boston: I. Knapp.
- Garrison, William (1834). A brief sketch of the trial of William Lloyd Garrison, for an alleged libel on Francis Todd, of Newburyport, Mass. Boston: Printed by Garrison and Knapp.
- Child, David Lee (1834). Oration in honor of universal emancipation in the British empire, delivered at South Reading, August, first, 1834. Boston: Printed by Garrison and Knapp.
- Stanford, H. B.; Thome, James A.; Cox, Samuel H. (1834). Debate at the Lane Seminary, Cincinnati : speech of James A. Thome, of Kentucky, delivered at the annual meeting of the American Anti-Slavery Society, May 6, 1834 : letter of the Rev. Dr. Samuel H. Cox against the American Colonization Society. Boston: Published by Garrison & Knapp.
- New England Anti-Slavery Convention (1834). Address to the people of the United States on the subject of slavery. Boston: Published by Garrison & Knapp.
- A friend of liberty (1834). The Maryland scheme of expatriation examined. Boston: Published by Garrison & Knapp.
- A member of the bar (1834). Report of the arguments of counsel, in the case of Prudence Crandall, plff. in error, vs. State of Connecticut : before the Supreme Court of Errors, at their session at Brooklyn, July term, 1834. Boston: Published by Garrison & Knapp.
- Birney, James G. (1834). Letter on Colonization, Addressed to the Rev. Thornton J. Mills, Corresponding Secretary of the Kentucky Colonization Society by Hon. James G. Birney, Late Vice-President of the Kentucky Colonization Society. Boston: Garrison and Knapp.

== 1835 ==
- New-England Anti-Slavery Society (1835). Third annual report of the board of managers of the New-England Anti-Slavery Society : presented Jan. 21, 1835. Boston: Printed by Garrison and Knapp.
- Garrison, William (1835). Juvenile poems : for the use of free American children, of every complexion [on the topic of slavery]. Boston: Printed by Garrison and Knapp.
- May, Samuel J. (1835). Letter addressed to the editor of the Christian examiner. Printed by Garrison & Knapp. Boston. OCLC 255383154.

== 1836 ==
- Ohio Anti-slavery Convention (1836). Report on the condition of the people of color in the state of Ohio : From the Proceedings of the Ohio Anti-slavery Convention, held at Putnam, on the 22d, 23d, and 24th of April, 1835. Published by Isaac Knapp.
- Boston Female Anti-slavery Society (1836). Report of the Boston Female Anti-Slavery Society; with a concise statement of events, previous and subsequent to the Annual Meeting of 1835. Half-title: Right and Wrong in Boston. Printer not stated. Boston Female Anti-slavery Society.
- Massachusetts Anti-Slavery Society (1836). Fourth annual report of the board of managers of the Massachusetts Anti-Slavery Society : with some account of the annual meeting, January 20, 1836. Boston: Published by Isaac Knapp. Archived from the original on May 28, 2025.
- William, Goodell (1936). A Full statement of the reasons which were in part offered to the committee of the legislature of Massachusetts : on the fourth and eighth of March, showing why there should be no penal laws enacted, and no condemnatory resolutions passed by the legislature, respecting abolitionits [sic] and anti-slavery societies. Printed by Isaac Knapp. Boston: Massachusetts Anti-Slavery Society. Archived from the original on May 28, 2025.
- New-England Anti-Slavery Society (1936). Proceedings of the Anti-Slavery Convention, held in Boston, May 24, 25, 26, 1836. Printed by Isaac Knapp. Isaac Knapp.
- Thompson, George; Breckinridge, Robert J.; Burleigh, Charles C. (1836). Discussion on American slavery : between George Thompson, Esq., agent of the British and Foreign Society for the abolition of slavery throughout the world, and Rev. Robert J. Breckinridge, delegate from the General Assembly of the Presbyterian Church in the United States, to the congregational union of England and Wales, holden [sic] in the Rev. Dr. Wardlaw's chapel, Glasgow, Scotland, on the evenings of the 13th, 14th, 15th, 16th, 17th of June, 1836, with an appendix [by Charles C. Burleigh]. Published by Isaac Knapp.
- Thompson, George; Garrison, Wm. Lloyd (1836). Lectures of George Thompson: With a Full Report of the Discussion Between Mr. Thompson and Mr. Borthwick, the pro-slavery agent, held at the Royal Amphitheatre, Liverpool, Eng., and which continued for six evenings with unabated interest; compiled from various editions — also, a brief History of his Connection with the anti-slavery cause in England. Published by Isaac Knapp.
- Boston Female Anti-Slavery Society (1836). Annual Report of the Boston Female Anti-Slavery Society; being a concise history of the cases of the slave child, Med, and of the women demanded as slaves of the Supreme Judicial Court of Mass. with all the other proceedings of the society. Isaac Knapp, printer. Boston: Boston Female Anti-Slavery Society.
- Boston Female Anti-Slavery Society (1836). Annual Report of the Boston Female Anti-Slavery Society; being a concise history of the cases of the slave child, Med, and of the women demanded as slaves of the Supreme Judicial Court of Mass. with all the other proceedings of the society. Isaac Knapp, printer (2nd ed.). Boston: Boston Female Anti-Slavery Society.
- Knapp, Isaac, ed. (1836). A collection of valuable documents : being Birney's vindication of abolitionists—Protest of the American A.S. Society—To the people of the United States, or, To such Americans as value their rights—Letter from the executive committee of the N.Y.A.S. Society, to the exec. com. of the Ohio State A.S.S. at Cincinnati—Outrage upon southern rights. Boston: Published by Isaac Knapp.
- Reception of George Thompson in Great Britain [Compiled from various British Publications.]. Boston: Published by Isaac Knapp. 1836.

== 1837 ==
- Whittier, John Greenleaf (1837). Poems written during the progress of the abolition question in the United States, between the years 1830 and 1838. Published by Isaac Knapp.
- Equiano, Olaudah (1837). The life of Olaudah Equiano, or Gustavus Vassa, the African. Written by himself. Published by Isaac Knapp.
- Thompson, George (1837). Letters and addresses by George Thompson, during his mission in the United States, from Oct. 1st, 1834, to Nov. 27, 1835. Published by Isaac Knapp.
- New-England Anti-Slavery Society (1837). Annual report of the Board of Managers of the Massachusetts Anti-Slavery Society, with some account of the annual meeting. Printed by Isaac Knapp.
- New-England Anti-Slavery Society (1837). Proceedings of the fourth New England Anti-Slavery Convention : held in Boston, May 30, 31, and June 1 and 2, 1837. Printed by Isaac Knapp.
- Boston Female Anti-Slavery Society (1837). Annual Report of the Boston Female Anti-Slavery Society, with a sketch of the Obstacles thrown in the way of Emancipation by certain Clerical Abolitionists and Advocates for the subjection of Woman. Boston: Published by Isaac Knapp.
- Bourne, George (1837). Slavery illustrated in its effects upon woman and domestic society. Boston: Published by Isaac Knapp.
- Boston Female Anti-Slavery Society (1837). Annual Report of the Boston Female Anti-Slavery Society, with a sketch of the Obstacles thrown in the way of Emancipation by certain Clerical Abolitionists and Advocates for the subjection of Woman, in 1837. Boston: Published by Isaac Knapp.
- Howland, Henry J. (1837). The Generous planter, and his carpenter, Ben. "The following narrative was first published in the Anti-slavery record for August, 1835. Its present form is adapted for the Sabbath school and juvenile library, where the story, true to life and nature, richly merits a place." (Verso of title page, giving name (printer?) of Henry J. Howland, Worcester, Mass.). Boston: Published by Isaac Knapp. OCLC 83005397.
- Newcomb, Harvey (1837). The "negro pew": being an inquiry concerning the propriety of distinctions in the house of God, on account of color. Boston: Published by Isaac Knapp.
- Easton, Rev. H., "a colored man" (1837). A treatise on the intellectual character, and civil and political condition of the colored people of the U. States : and the prejudice exercised towards them : with a sermon on the duty of the church to them. Boston: Printed and published by Isaac Knapp.
- Southard, N[athaniel], ed. (1836). —Volume I No. 3— The American anti-slavery almanac, for 1838, Being the second after Bissextile or Leap-Year, and the 62nd of American Independence. Adapted to most parts of the United States. Boston: Published by Isaac Knapp.

== 1838 ==
- Rankin, John (1838). Letters on American Slavery, addressed to Mr. Thomas Rankin, merchant at Middlebrook, Augusta Co., Va (5th ed.). Boston: Published by Isaac Knapp.
- Garrison, Wm. Lloyd (1838). An address delivered in Marlboro Chapel, Boston, July 4, 1838. Published by Isaac Knapp.
- Garrison, Wm. Lloyd (1838). An address delivered at the Broadway Tabernacle, N.Y. August 1, 1838 : by request of the people of color of that city, in commemoration of the complete emancipation of 600,000 slaves on that day, in the British West Indies. Published by Isaac Knapp.
- Boston Female Anti-Slavery Society (1838). Fifth Annual report of the Boston Female Anti-Slavery Society. Boston: Printed by Isaac Knapp.
- Boyle, James; Garrison, William (1838). A letter from James Boyle, to Wm. Lloyd Garrison, respecting the clerical appeal, sectarianism, true holiness &c., also, Lines on Christian rest, by Mr. Garrison. Preface by Garrison. Boston: Published by Isaac Knapp.
- American Anti-Slavery Society; Massachusetts Anti-Slavery Society (1838). Constitution of the anti-slavery society. Contains "Constitution, &c." (largely written by Garrison), 3–5; "Declaration of the Anti-Slavery Convention. Assembled in Philadelphia, December 3, 1833", 6–10; "Constitution of the American Anti-Slavery Society", 11; and "Constitution of the Massachusetts Anti-Slavery Society", 12. Boston: Printed by Isaac Knapp.
- Stedman, John Gabriel (1838). Narrative of Joanna; An Emancipated Slave, of Surinam. (From Stedman's Narrative of a Five Year's Expedition Against the Revolted Negroes of Surinam). Boston: Published by Isaac Knapp.
- Knapp, Isaac (1838). Report on the injustice and inequality of the Militia Law of Massachusetts, with regard to the rights of conscience. Boston: Printed by Isaac Knapp. OCLC 724289174.
- Anti-Slavery Convention of American Women (1838). An appeal to the women of the nominally free states, : issued by an Anti-slavery Convention of American Women. Held by adjournments from the 9th to the 12th of May, 1837 (2nd ed.). Boston: Published by Isaac Knapp. OCLC 191237873.
- Hayrick, Elizabeth (1838). Immediate, not gradual abolition : or, An inquiry into the shortest, safest, and most effectual means of getting rid of West Indian slavery. Boston: Published by Isaac Knapp.
- Beecher, Lyman (1838). The ballot box a remedy for national crimes : a sermon entitled "The remedy for dueling," by Rev. Lyman Beecher, D.D., applied to the crime of slaveholding. Sermon entitled the remedy for dueling. Boston: Published by Isaac Knapp.
- Williams, James (1838). Authentic narrative of James Williams, an American slave. Title page has title Narrative of James Williams, an American slave : who was for several years a driver on a cotton plantation in Alabama, "New York: Published by the American Anti-Slavery Society", then "Boston: Isaac Knapp". Boston: Published by Isaac Knapp.
- Stone, Thomas T. (1838). The martyr of freedom [Elijah Lovejoy] : a discourse delivered at East Machias, November 30, and at Machias, December 7, 1837. Boston: Published by Isaac Knapp.
- Wheatley, Phillis; Odell, Margaretta Matilda; Horton, George Moses (1838). Memoir and poems of Phillis Wheatley : a native African and a slave; also, Poems by a slave (3rd ed.). Boston: Published by Isaac Knapp.
- New England Non-Resistance Society (1838). Proceedings of the Peace Convention : held in Boston, in the Marlboro' Chapel, September 18, 19 & 20, 1838. Boston: Printed by Isaac Knapp. OCLC 765811402.
- Grimké, Sarah M. (1838). Letters on the Equality of the Sexes, and the Condition of Woman: Addressed to Mary S. Parker, President of the Boston Female Anti-Slavery Society. Boston: Published by Isaac Knapp.
- Sixth annual report of the board of managers of the Massachusetts Anti-Slavery Society : presented January 24, 1838 : with an appendix. Boston: Published by Isaac Knapp. 1838. Archived from the original on May 28, 2025.

== 1839 ==
- Massachusetts Anti-Slavery Society (1839). Seventh annual report of the board of managers of the Mass. Anti-Slavery Society. Presented January 24, 1839. : With an appendix. Boston: Isaac Knapp. Archived from the original on May 28, 2025.

== 1841 ==
- Storrs, Richard S. (1841). The day of small things : a sermon preached at the ordination of the Rev. William R. Chapman, over the church and congregation of Garden Street Chapel, Boston, September 8, 1841. Boston: Printed by Isaac Knapp.
