= Helen Eliza Benson Garrison =

American abolitionist (1811–1876)

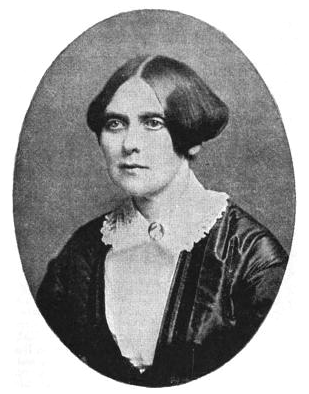
- Born: Helen Eliza Benson; February 23, 1811; Providence, Rhode Island, U.S.
- Died: January 25, 1876 (aged 64); Roxbury, Massachusetts, U.S.
- Spouse: William Lloyd Garrison

Helen Eliza Benson Garrison (February 23, 1811 – January 25, 1876) was an American abolitionist, fundraiser, and advocate for the American Anti-Slavery Society (AASS).

Garrison managed the annual Boston Anti-Slavery Bazaar, a fair to raise money for the AASS, and ran her home as a salon for radical thinkers and activists. She welcomed numerous notable abolitionists under her roof including Wendell Phillips, who was also an advocate for Native Americans; Lucy Stone, the suffragist; and George Thompson, the British Member of Parliament. A successful fundraiser, she raised money to aid impoverished freedmen.

Following her marriage, Helen Garrison acted as a professional companion to her husband William Lloyd Garrison, who was a prominent social reformer, anti-slavery activist, and supporter of the rights of women. After her death, William Garrison wrote the funeral biography for his wife entitled, Helen Eliza Garrison: A Memorial.

== Biography ==
Helen Benson was born in Providence, Rhode Island to Sarah Thurber and George Benson, who raised her in a merchant and abolitionist family. Helen's father was a member of the Pennsylvania Society for Promoting the Abolition of Slavery. Her brothers Henry and George were also abolitionist activists. Her brother Henry helped to publicize William Garrison's newspaper The Liberator starting in 1831, popularizing it in Rhode Island and deepening anti-slavery sentiments in the area; he later became secretary and general agent of the Massachusetts Anti-Slavery Society in 1835.

When Helen was nineteen years old, she met her future husband William Garrison. He wrote that he fell in love with her at first sight, at a time when he was struggling to maintain The Liberator. Helen's engagement to William prompted correspondence in which they reflected on the precarity of marriage for women in nineteenth-century America, and women's reliance on men's affections to gain stability in life. These exchanges prompted William to start thinking "seriously about women's rights", many years before he began advocating for including women as members in the Anti-Slavery Society.

Letter from William Lloyd Garrison to Helen Eliza Benson

Just a week after the Garrisons' marriage, Helen turned their home in Roxbury, Massachusetts – called "Freedom's Cottage" — into a salon for radical liberals. In running her household as such, she welcomed anti-slavery friends and colleagues, turning their house into an important networking site for progressive reformers. From there, Helen also maintained written correspondence with reformers including Theodore Dwight Weld of Lane Seminary; the secretary of the American Anti-Slavery Society, Elizur Wright; Gerrit Smith the philanthropist; Henry Grew the Quaker abolitionist; and the author Parker Pillsbury.

Helen Garrison gave birth to seven children, two daughters and five sons. One infant daughter died as did their fourth son when he was seven. The Garrisons had named their fourth son after Charles Follen, the first professor of German at Harvard University. According to her husband, Helen "never fully recovered" from the deaths of her children.

In 1863, Helen suffered a stroke that paralyzed the left side of her body. This blow to her physical mobility led Helen to stop her activist work and to retire to the Roxbury Highlands. William wrote that his wife's "last efforts were in behalf of the poor Southern freedmen, as she had devoted a considerable portion of [the day of her stroke] in soliciting aid for them".

Helen Garrison died in 1876. Her funeral was conducted by Reverend Samuel May. A crowd of high-profile leftist reformers attended, including Wendell Phillips and Lucy Stone.

== Legacy ==
By the time of her death, Helen Garrison's legacy was well-established among contemporaries. For example, Wendell Phillips stated that any person could "hardly appreciate the large help [Helen] gave the anti-slavery movement", because by bringing abolitionists under her roof "[s]he made a family" of them, unifying an activist group. Lucy Stone testified to the importance of Helen's hospitality among reformers, and to the fact that even after Helen fell ill and was no longer able to participate in political organizing, her support of activists proved to be "valuable service". Finally, Stone suggested Helen was an inspiration to youth in her time.
