= Henry Mayer (historian) =

American historian

Henry Mayer (May 6, 1941 - July 24, 2000) was an American historian who was best known as a biographer of abolitionist William Lloyd Garrison. Mayer lived in Berkeley, California. He died at age 59 of a heart attack while bicycling in Glacier National Park, Montana.
