= Isaac Knapp =

American journalist and abolitionist (1804–1843)

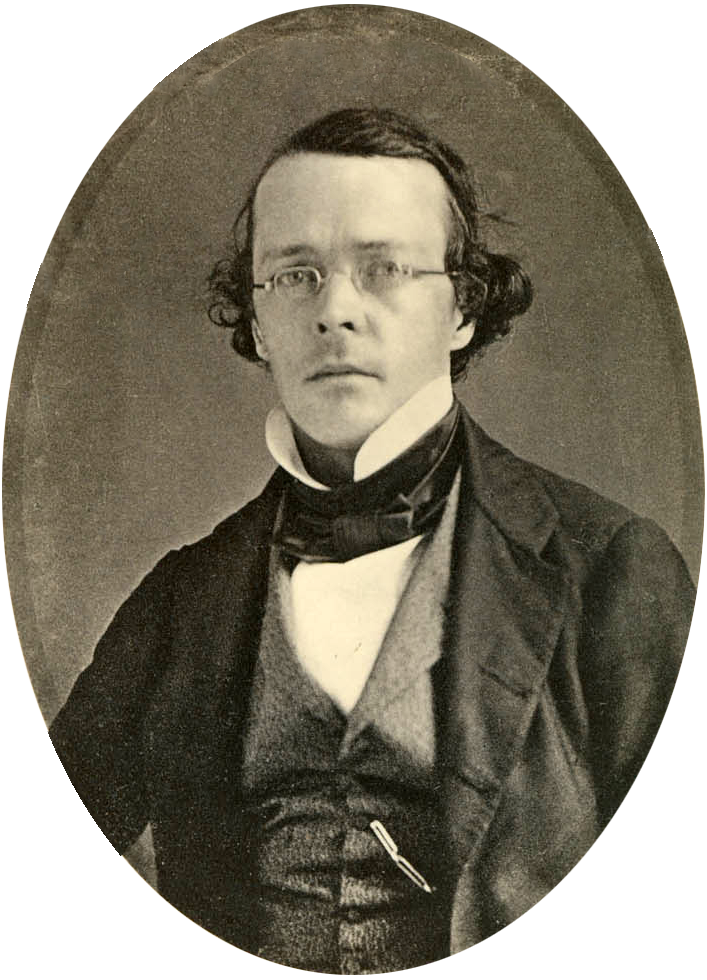
- Born: January 11, 1804; Newburyport, Massachusetts
- Died: September 14, 1843 (aged 39); Boston, Massachusetts
- Occupations: printer and publisher

Isaac Knapp (January 11, 1804 – September 14, 1843) was an American abolitionist printer, publisher, and bookseller in Boston, Massachusetts. He is remembered primarily for his collaboration with William Lloyd Garrison in printing and publishing The Liberator newspaper.

== Biography ==
Knapp was born in Newburyport, Massachusetts, to Philip Coombs Knapp and Abigail Remmick; siblings included Abigail Knapp. In 1825 he was proprietor of the Essex Courant newspaper, published there.

With his friend William Lloyd Garrison he printed the anti-slavery Liberator newspaper, from 1831 to 1839. He also co-founded the New England Anti-Slavery Society. His printing office was located on Congress Street (circa 1831) and then on Cornhill. In 1837, the address of the Boston office of the American Anti-Slavery Society was Knapp's address. In later years of the 1830s he ceased printing books, used other printers, and turned his printing office into a bookstore. He frequently used blank pages at the end of the books he published to advertise a large and ever-changing list of abolitionist publications available from him.

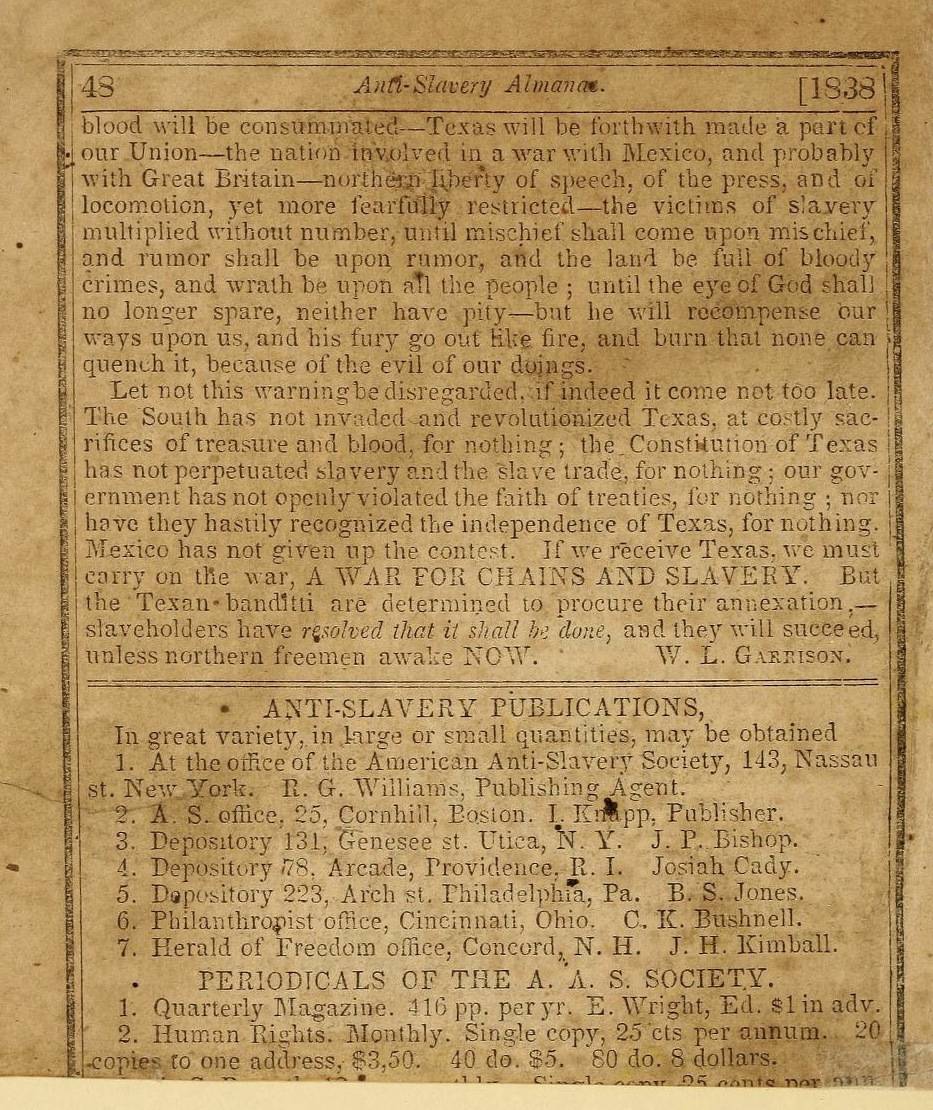
Page from Knapp's Anti-Slavery Almanac for 1838, showing that the Boston office of the American Anti-Slavery Society was in his shop.

Knapp's name disappears from the masthead as printer of The Liberator as of January 1840. In the July 24, 1840, issue, there is an advertisement for the abolitionist printers Dow and Jackson "successors to Isaac Knapp".

We do not have Knapp's story of how and why this happened. Garrison described him as "a most loving, faithful, devoted friend and brother.... He was naturally amiable, kind, and obliging even to excess.... He deserves pity rather than censure, and never can I find it in my breast to say a bitter word of him.... I am not sure that I could have commenced the printing of the Liberator, had it not been for his uniting with me in partnership, and participating in the labors and necessities of my lone situation." However, according to Garrison, "he was altogether too generous...and having no business adaptation, be consequently involved himself deeply in debt while attempting to carry on business. It was thus he became depressed in spirit, and, instead of calmly submitting to the stroke of adversity, vainly sought to find relief from his sorrows (as millions have done before) in the intoxicating bowl." "[H]is disconnexion with the Liberator ...[was] absolutely essential to the existence of the paper."

In 1841 Knapp complained that "he has been deprived of his interest in the Liberator unjustly—that Mr. Garrison and 'a certain rich man' have treated him badly—therefore he intends to print a paper to be called 'Knapp's Liberator'." Only one issue of this paper is known to have been published, on January 8, 1842 (only known copy at the Massachusetts Historical Society).

== Works issued by Knapp ==
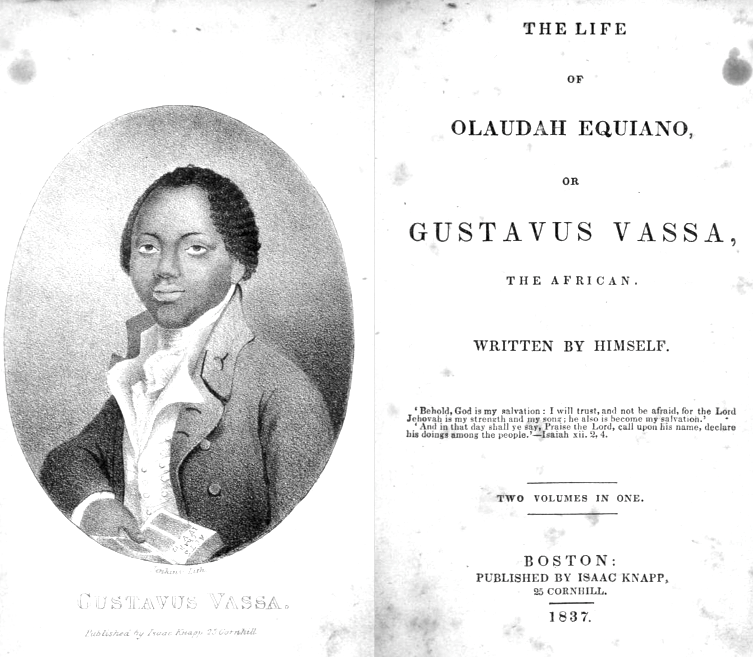
The Interesting Narrative of the Life of Olaudah Equiano, 1837

== Knapp as bookseller ==
- A catalog of anti-slavery publications sold by Isaac Knapp, published at end of Narrative of Joanna; An Emancipated Slave, of Surinam, 1838.
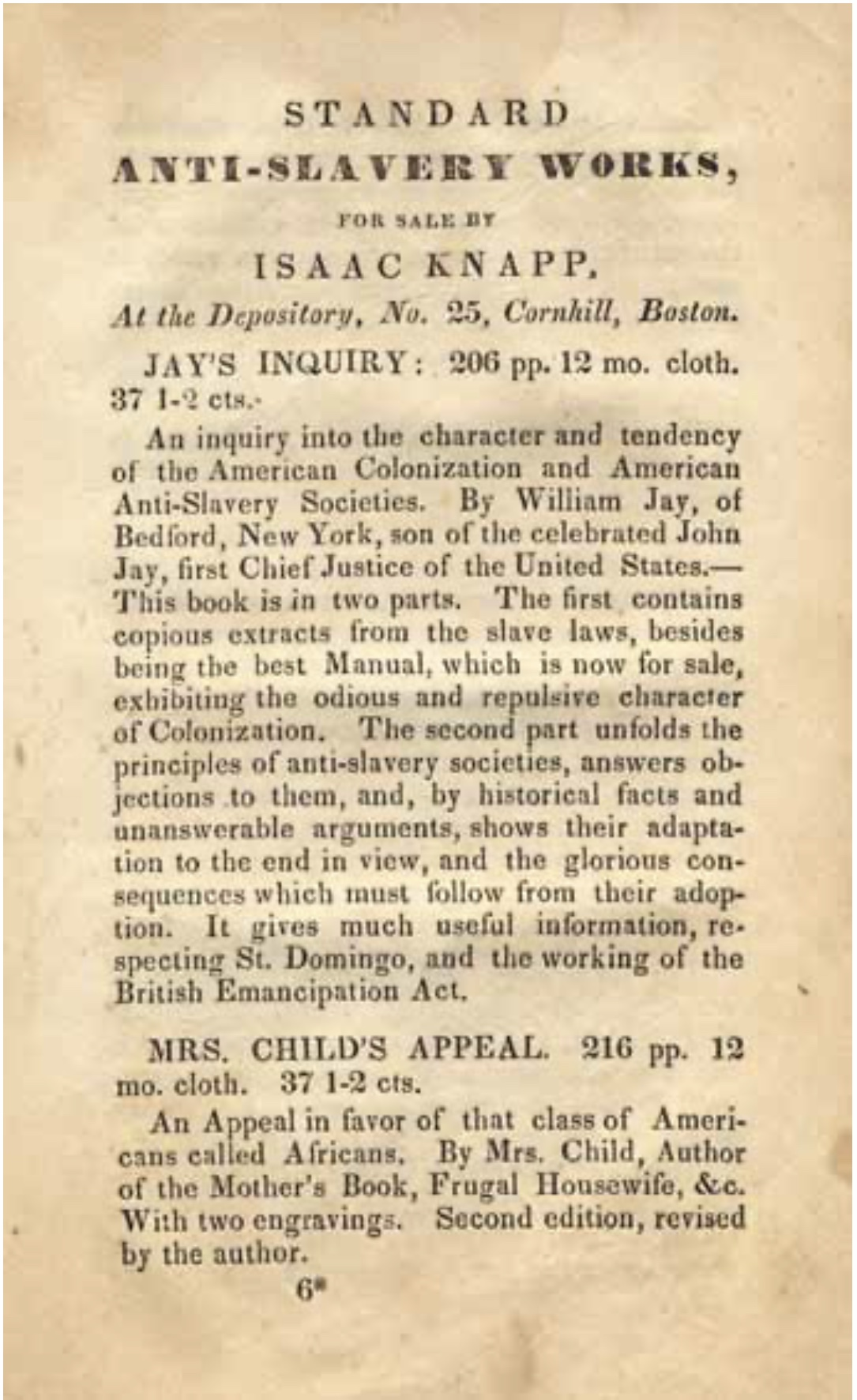
Catalog of anti-slavery publications sold by Isaac Knapp, p. 1

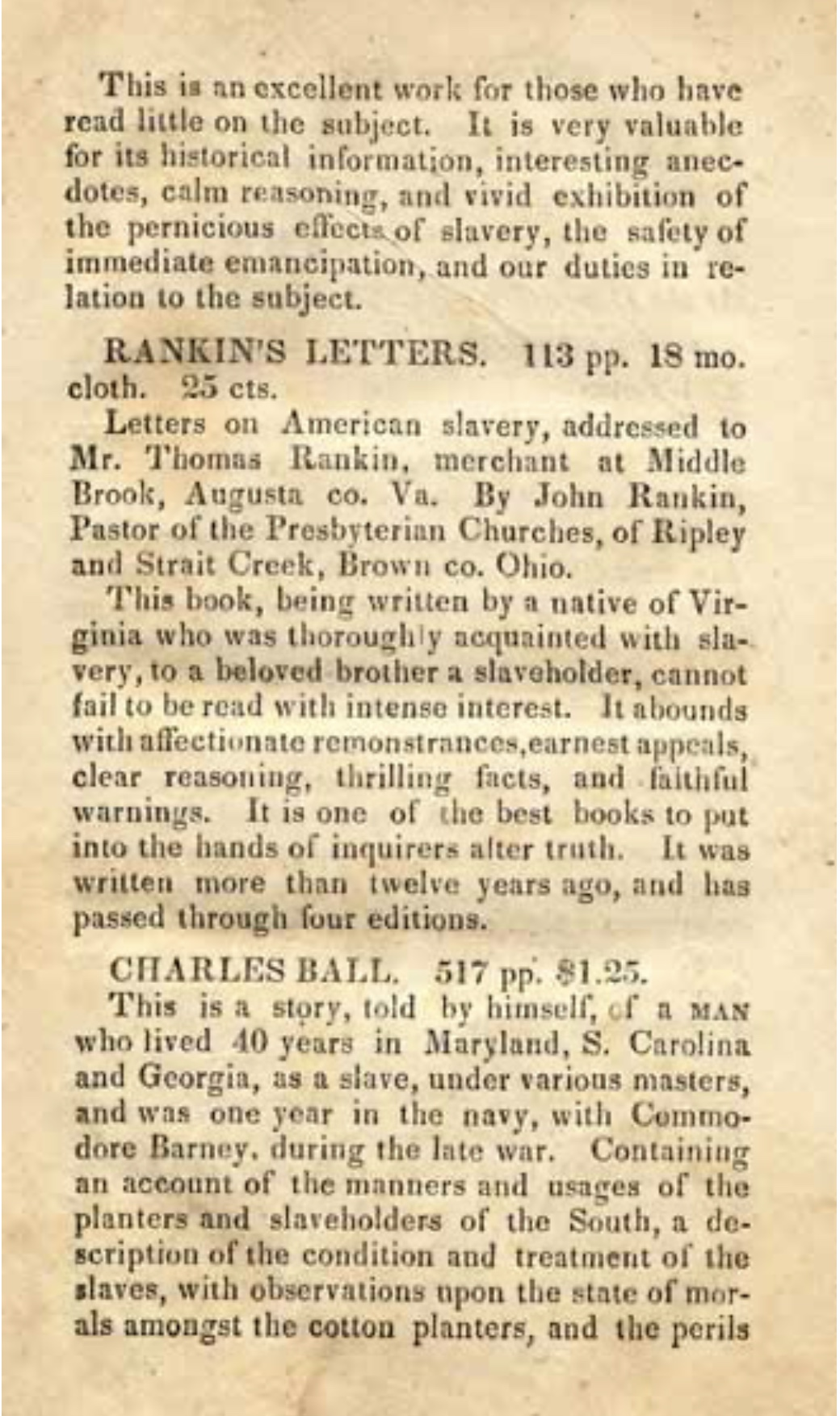
Catalog of anti-slavery publications sold by Isaac Knapp, p. 2

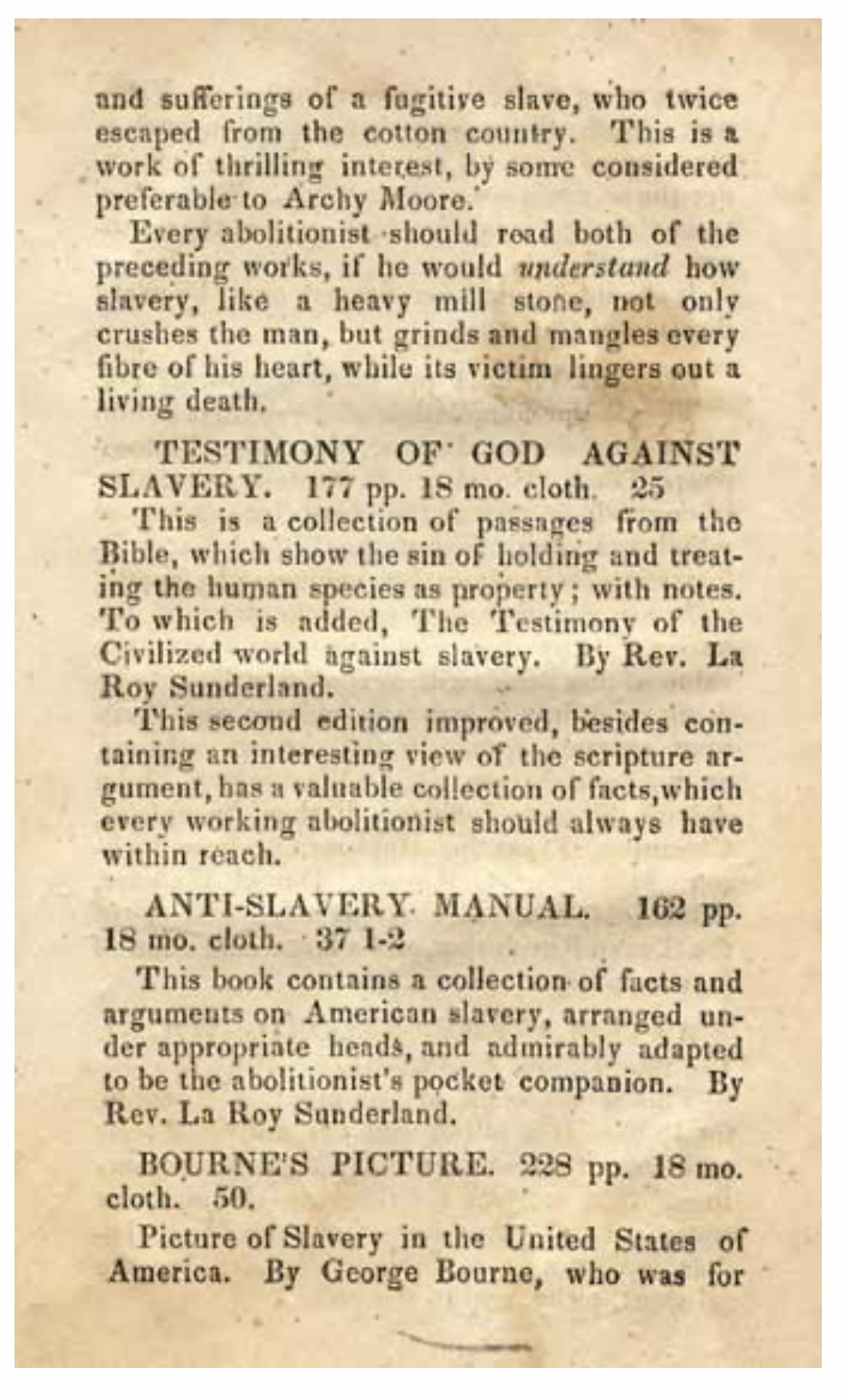
Catalog of anti-slavery publications sold by Isaac Knapp, p. 3

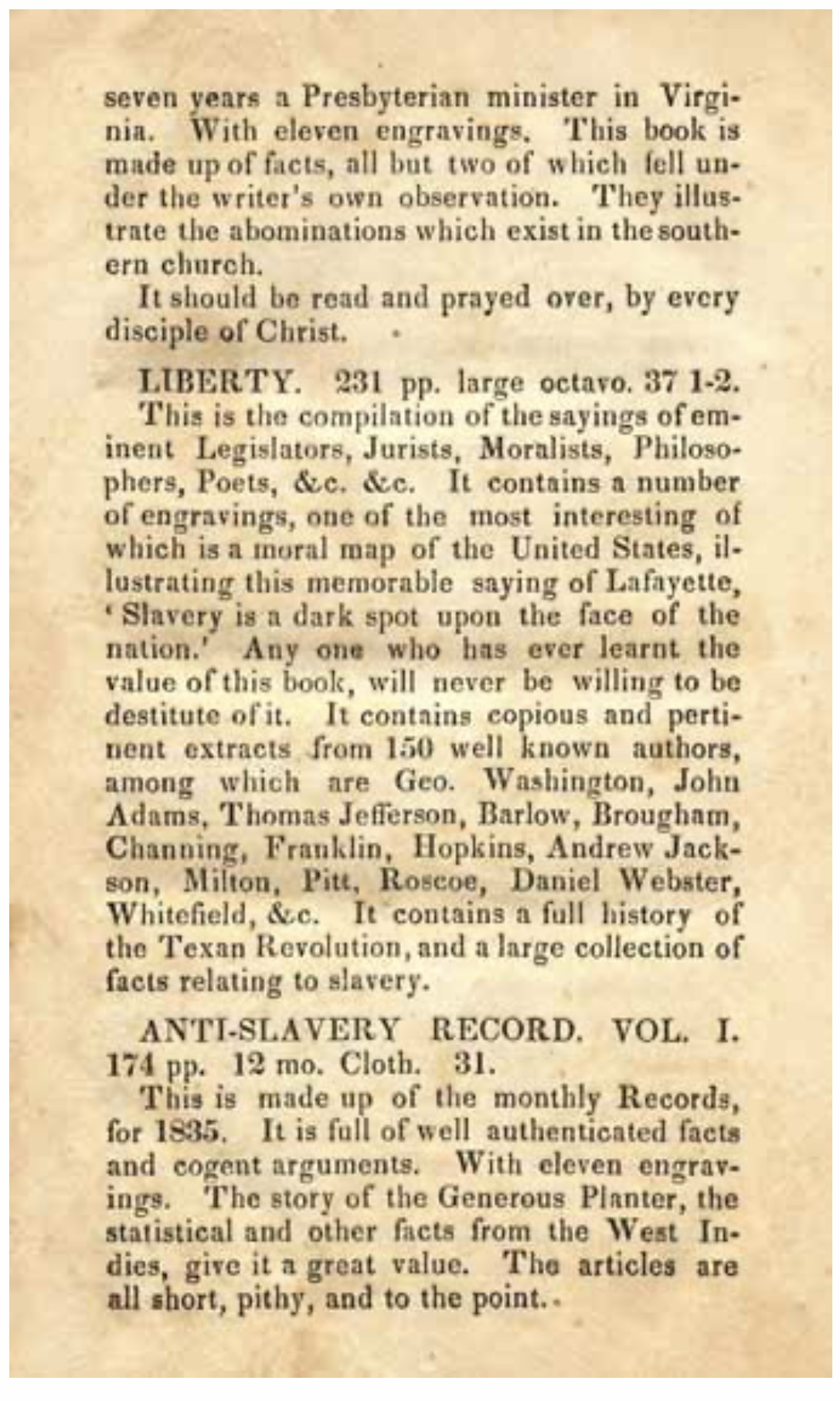
Catalog of anti-slavery publications sold by Isaac Knapp, p. 4

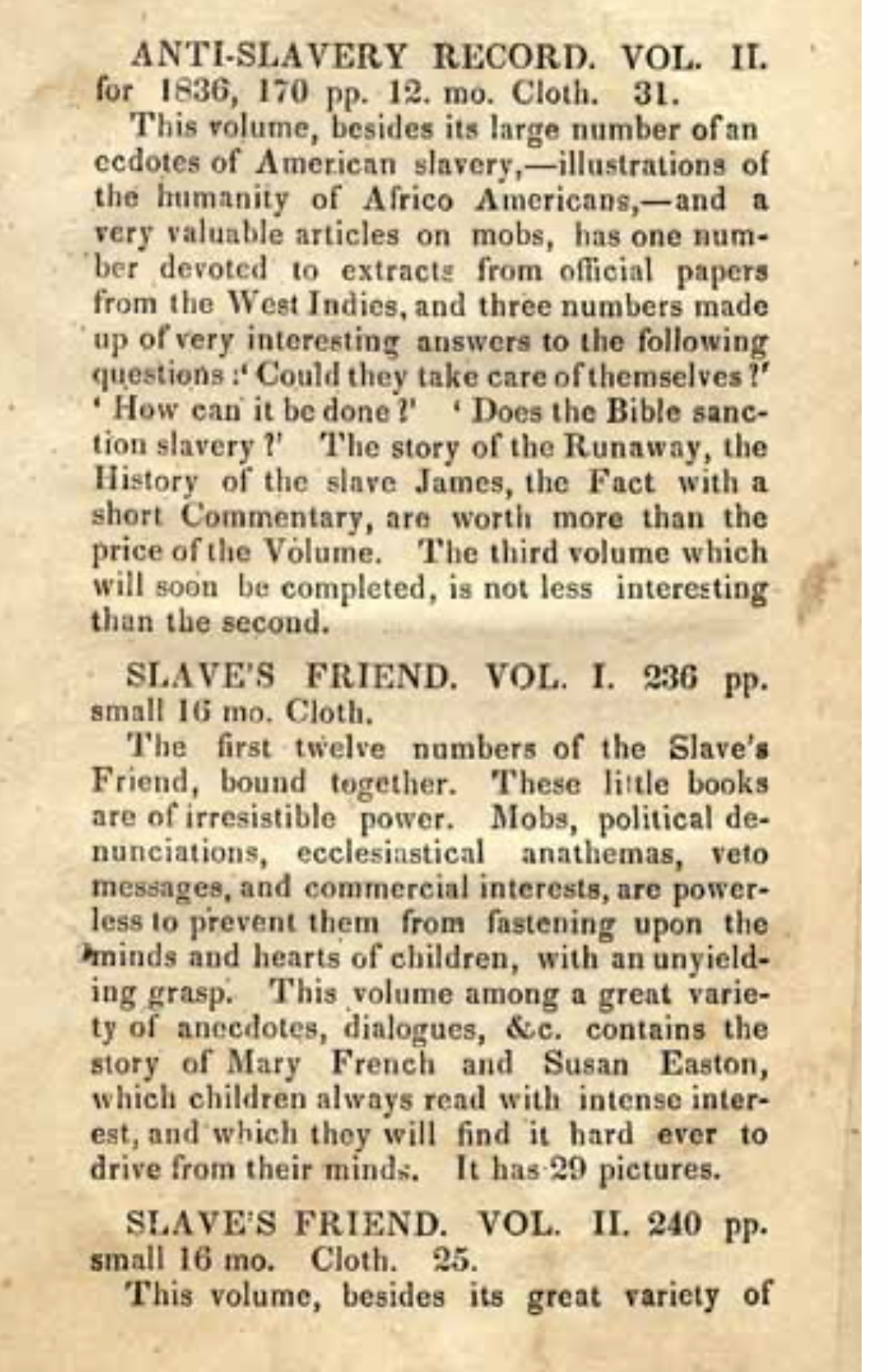
Catalog of anti-slavery publications sold by Isaac Knapp, p. 5

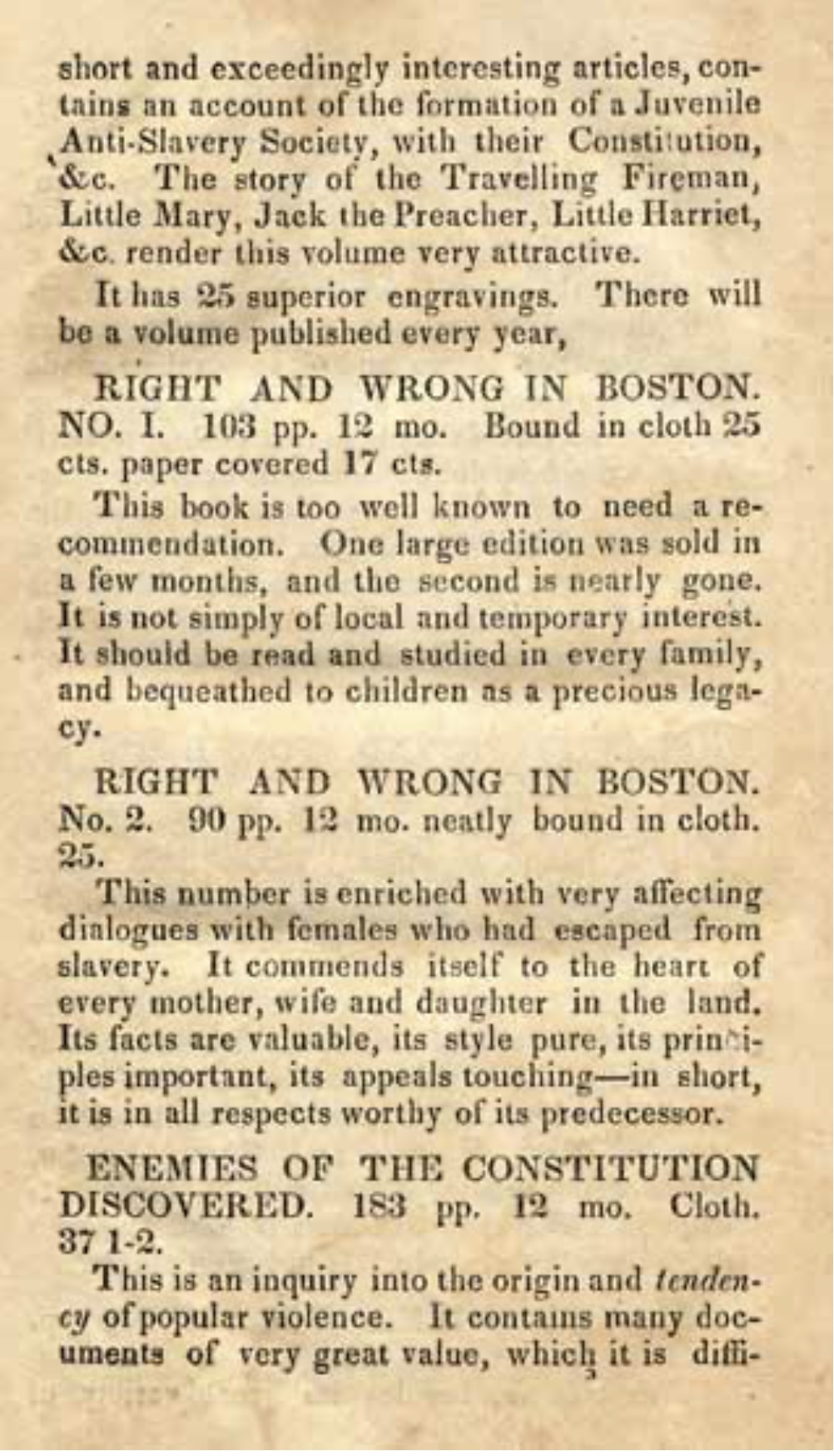
Catalog of anti-slavery publications sold by Isaac Knapp, p. 6

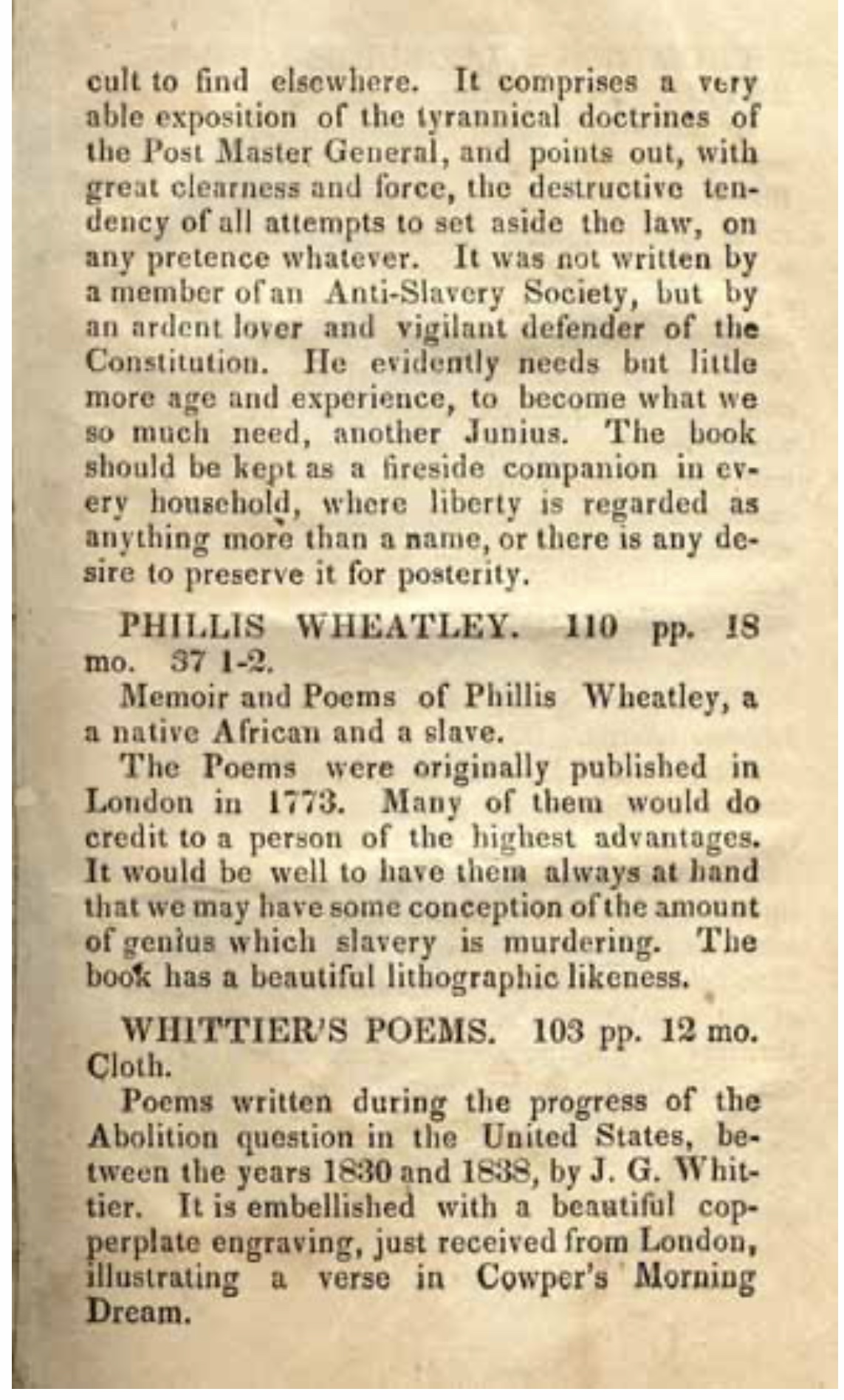
Catalog of anti-slavery publications sold by Isaac Knapp, p. 7

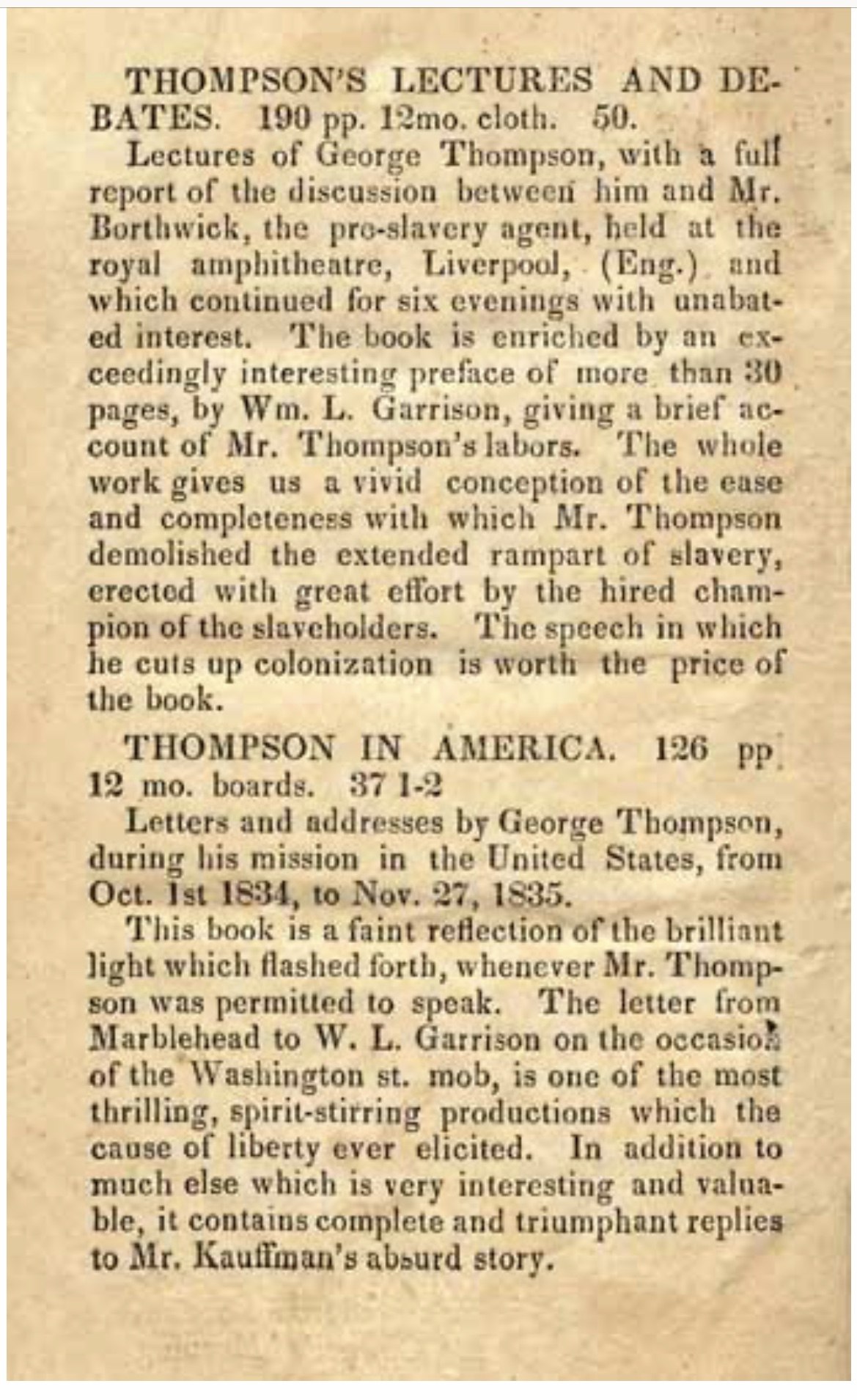
Catalog of anti-slavery publications sold by Isaac Knapp, p. 8
- "Descriptive Catalogue of Anti-Slavery Works, for Sale by Isaac Knapp" (PDF), Liberator, November 10, 1837
  - Titles listed: Abolition of the Slave Trade, Adams' Letters, Adams' Oration, Adin Ballou's Discourse, Anti-Slavery Catechism, Anti-Slavery Manual, Anti-Slavery Record, Archy Moore, Authentic Anecdotes of American Slavery, Barrows on the Slave Question, Birney's Second Letter, Bourne's Picture, British Apprenticeships, Channing on Slavery, Channing on Texas, Charles Ball, Chloe Spear, Crandall's Trial, Discussion, Dissertation on Servitude, Dresser, Stones' Letters, &c., Enemies of the Constitution Discovered, Evils and Cure, Godwin on Slavery, Granville Sharp, Gustavus Vassa, Important Pamphlet, James Jackson, Jay's Inquiry, Juvenile Poems, Kentucky Address, Lemuel Haynes, Liberty, Memoir of Phillis Wheatley, Miss Beecher Reviewed, Miss Grimke's Appeal, Miss Grimke's Epistle, Mott's Sketches, Mrs. Child's Appeal, Mrs. Stewart's Productions, Objections Answered, Our Liberties in Danger, Phillis Wheatley, Rankin's Letters, Right and Wrong in Boston, Slave Produce, Slave's Friend, Smith's Bible Argument, Songs of the Free, Stanton's Remarks, Stewart's West India Question, Testimony of God Against Slavery, The Fountain, The Generous Planter, The Negro Pew, The Oasis, Thompson at Manchester, Thompson in America, Thompson in G. Britain, Thompson's Lectures and Debates, Valuable Documents, Vigilance Committee, Whittier's Poems, Wilberforce.
- "Standard Anti-Slavery Books for Sale by Isaac Knapp, no.25 Cornhill". Catalog is at end of book. 1838.
- Another listing of anti-slavery books, pamphlets, and newspapers appeared in The Rochester Freeman in 1839.
