= Seneca Village =

Former settlement in Manhattan, New York

Coordinates: 40.784002°N 73.968892°W

Location of Seneca Village in Central Park

Seneca Village was a 19th-century settlement of mostly African American landowners in the borough of Manhattan in New York City, within what would become present-day Central Park. The settlement was located near the current Upper West Side neighborhood, approximately bounded by Central Park West and the axes of 82nd Street, 89th Street, and Seventh Avenue, had they been constructed through the park.

Seneca Village was founded in 1825 by free Black Americans, the first such community in the city, although under Dutch rule there was a "half-free" community of African-owned farms north of New Amsterdam. At its peak, the community had approximately 225 residents, three churches, two schools, and three cemeteries. The settlement was later also inhabited by Irish and German immigrants. Seneca Village existed until 1857, when, through eminent domain, the villagers and other settlers in the area were forced to leave and their houses were torn down for the construction of Central Park. The entirety of the village was dispersed.

Several vestiges of Seneca Village's existence have been found over the years, including two graves and a burial plot. The settlement was largely forgotten until the publication of Roy Rosenzweig and Elizabeth Blackmar's book The Park and the People: A History of Central Park in 1992. After a 1997 New-York Historical Society exhibition, the Seneca Village Project was formed in 1998 to raise awareness of the village, and several archaeological digs have been conducted. In 2001, a historical sign was unveiled, commemorating the site where Seneca Village once stood. In 2019, the Central Park Conservancy installed a temporary exhibit of signage in the park, marking the sites of the Village's churches, some houses, gardens, and natural features.

== Etymology ==
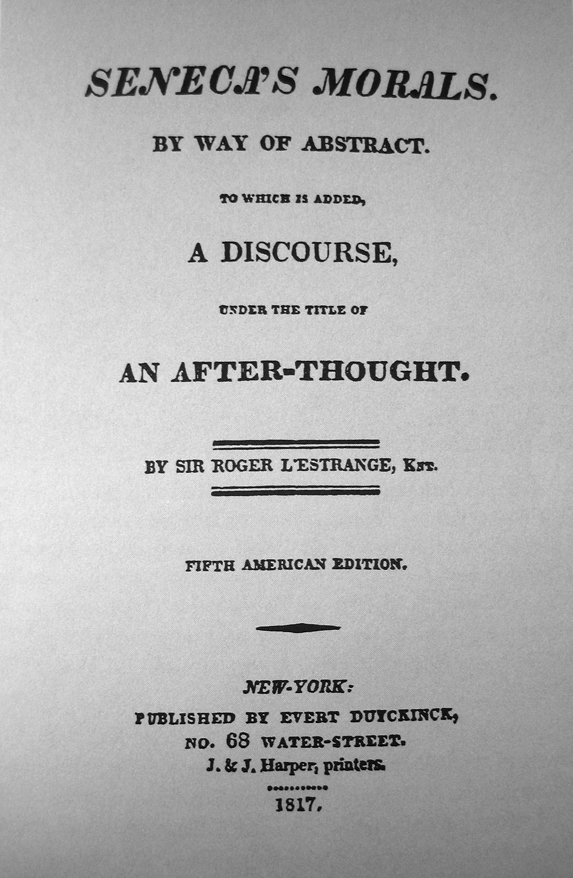
Seneca's Morals, 1817, American edition, first book published by Harper. Letter 47 may have influenced the naming of Seneca Village.

The origin of Seneca Village's name is obscure, and was only recorded by Thomas McClure Peters, rector of St. Michael's Episcopal Church; however, a number of theories have been advanced.

1. One theory suggests that the word "Seneca" came from Roman philosopher Seneca the Younger, whose Moral Epistles – particularly Letter 47 – were appreciated by African American activists and abolitionists. The scholar Leslie M. Alexander notes this as a possible influence of the African Free School.
2. The village could have also been named after the Seneca nation of Native Americans. Although the presence of Seneca specifically would be unlikely as their territory was distant, Peters did mention "white and black and Indian" as among the diverse population at the site, as well as "white and black and all intermediate shades" worshiping at All Angels', and there is a later report of "aborigines and cross-breed Indians" at its Sunday school. After 1857, Peters was involved in a church mission to the multi-racial Ramapough Mountain People of a nearby section of New Jersey by his friend Abram Hewitt's Ringwood Manor.
3. According to Central Park Conservancy historian Sara Cedar Miller, "Seneca" could have been influenced by anti-Native American and anti-Black slurs.
4. Another theory posits that Seneca Village could be named after the West African nation of Senegal, which may have been the origin country for some of the village's residents.
5. The name could have also come from use as a code-word on the Underground Railroad, when fugitive slaves from the Southern United States were being hidden in nearby areas. In the socially active "burned-over district", there was a noted concentration of abolitionism around Rochester and Seneca Falls in the former Seneca territory of Western New York.

== Existence ==
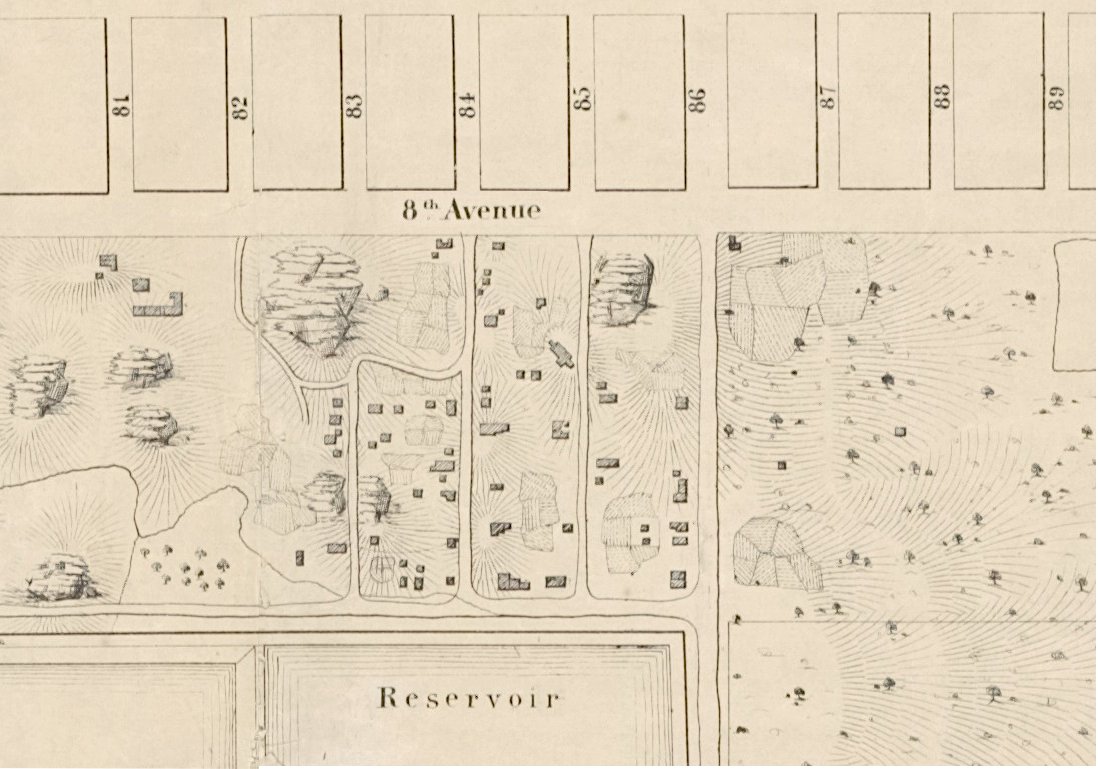
Map showing the former location of Seneca Village (Egbert Viele, 1856)

=== Development ===
Natural features on the Seneca Village landscape which still survive today are Summit Rock, then known as Goat Hill, the highest natural elevation in modern Central Park, and Tanner's Spring near its southern base. The settlement's main street was "Spring Street" as marked on an 1838 map, or as "old Lane" on an 1856 map, and it connected to "Stillwells Lane".

The previous landowner before African American settlement was a white farmer named John Whitehead, who purchased his property in 1824. One year later, Whitehead began selling off smaller lots from his property. At the time, the area was far from the core of New York City, which was centered south of 23rd Street in what is now Lower Manhattan. On September 27, 1825, a 25-year-old African American man named Andrew Williams, employed as a bootblack and later as a cartman, purchased three lots from the Whiteheads for $125. On the same day, African Methodist Episcopal Zion Church (AME Zion Church) trustee Epiphany Davis, employed as a feed store clerk, bought twelve lots for $578. Both men were part of the New York African Society for Mutual Relief, an organization whose members supported each other financially. The AME Zion Church bought six additional lots the same week, and by 1832, at least 24 lots had been sold to African Americans. Additional nearby development was centered around "York Hill", a plot bounded by where Sixth and Seventh Avenues would have been built, between 79th and 86th Streets. York Hill was mostly owned by the city, but 5 acres (2.0 ha) were purchased by William Matthews, a young African American, in the late 1830s. Matthews's African Union Church also bought land in Seneca Village around that time.

More African Americans began moving to Seneca Village after slavery in New York state was outlawed in 1827. In the 1830s, people from York Hill were forced to move so that a basin for the Croton Distributing Reservoir could be built, so many of York Hill's residents migrated to Seneca Village. The reservoir's massive granite walls formed a prominent landmark, bordering Seneca Village on the east. Seneca Village provided a safe haven during the anti-abolitionist riot of 1834.

Later, during the Great Famine of Ireland, many Irish immigrants came to live in Seneca Village, swelling the village's population by 30 percent during this time. Both African Americans and Irish immigrants were marginalized and faced discrimination throughout the city. Despite their social and racial conflicts elsewhere, the African Americans and Irish in Seneca Village lived close to each other. By 1855, one-third of the village's population was Irish. George Washington Plunkitt, who later became a Tammany Hall politician, was born in 1842 to Pat and Sara Plunkitt, two of the first Irish settlers at the western edge of the village on Nanny Goat Hill. This location was in the vicinity of a cluster of Irish-American households led by John Gallagher. Richard Croker, who later became the leader of Tammany, was born in Ireland, but he came with his family to Seneca Village in 1846, and lived there until his father received a job that enabled them to move.

By 1855, there were 52 houses in Seneca Village. On maps of the area, most of the houses were identified as one-, two-, or three-story houses made out of wood. Archeological excavations uncovered stone foundations and roofing materials, indicating that they were well-built. Some of the houses were identified as shanties, meaning that they were less well-constructed. Land ownership among Black residents was much higher than that in the city as a whole: more than half owned property in 1850, five times the property ownership rate of all New York City residents at the time. Many of Seneca Village's Black residents were landowners and relatively economically secure compared to their downtown counterparts in the Little Africa neighborhood by Greenwich Village. Many African-Americans owned property in Seneca Village but lived downtown, perhaps seeing it as an investment.

=== Inhabitants ===
Based on analysis of various documents including census records, maps, and tax records, researchers have estimated that in 1855, approximately 225 people lived in Seneca Village. On average, the residents had lived there for 22 years. Three-quarters of these residents had lived in Seneca Village at least since 1840, and nearly all had lived there since 1850. The unusually high level of address stability gave a sense of permanence and security to the community. At this time in New York City's history, most of the city's population lived below 14th Street; the region above 59th Street was only sporadically developed and was semi-rural or rural in character.

Under a New York state law created in 1821, African American men in the state could vote only if they had $250 worth of property and had lived in the state for at least three years. Owning property was a way to gain political power, and the purchase of land by Black people likely had a significant effect on their political engagement. Of the 13,000 Black New Yorkers in 1845, either 100 or 91 were qualified to vote that year. Of the voting-eligible Black population, 10 lived in Seneca Village.

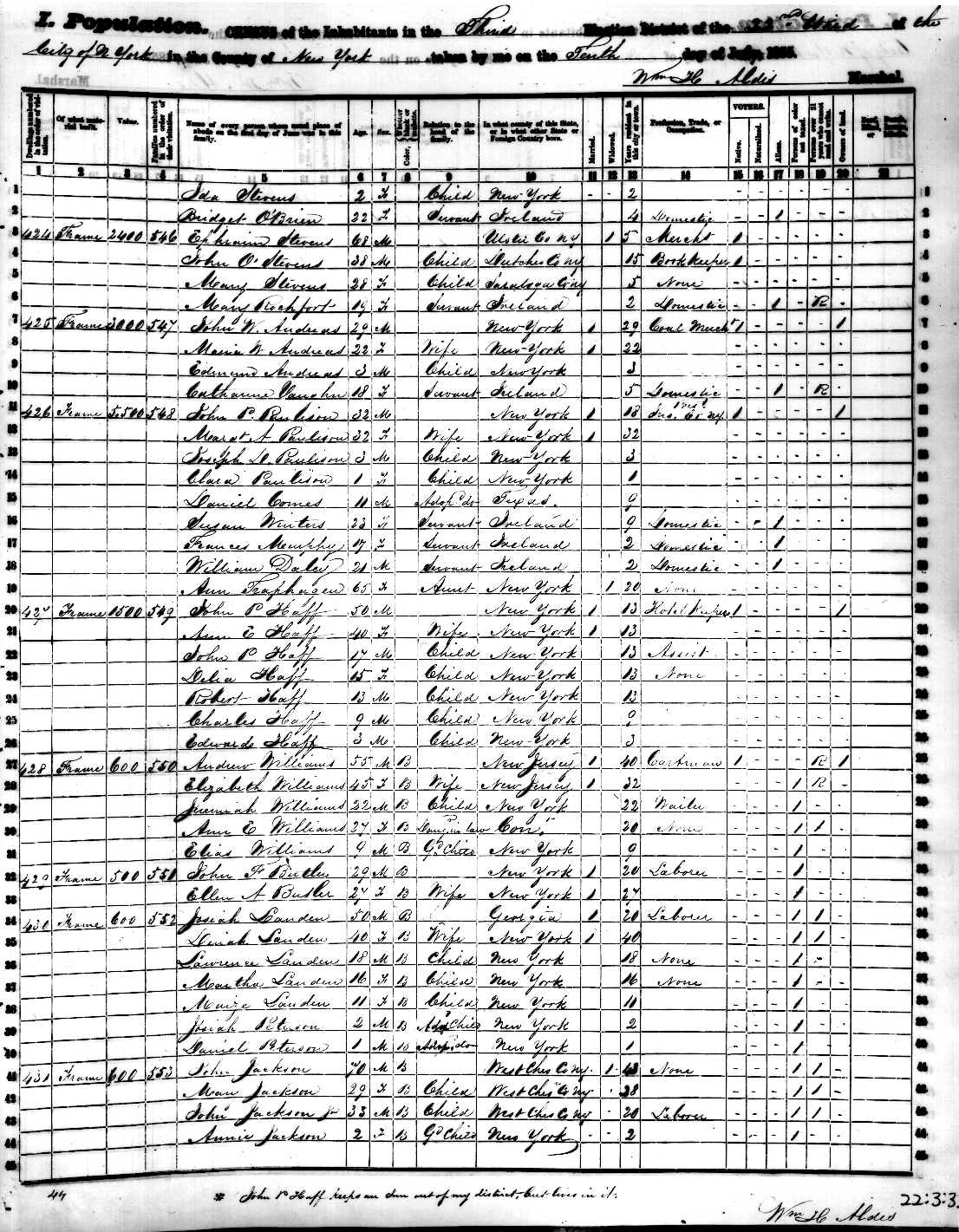
This 1855 census was the last census before Seneca Village was destroyed to build Central Park.

Nevertheless, many of the residents were still poor, since they worked in service industries such as construction, day labor, or food service. Only three residents could be considered middle-class as measured by occupation, of which two were grocers and the other was an innkeeper. Many Black women worked as domestic servants. However, historian Leslie M. Harris holds that the African-American middle class of the time should be judged by educational and social criteria that were different from that of the white middle class. Many residents boarded in homes they did not own, demonstrating that there was significant class stratification even with Seneca Village's high land ownership rate. Maps show that residents had gardens, likely to grow food for their own consumption. The residents likely also relied on the abundant natural resources nearby, such as fish from the nearby Hudson River, and the firewood from nearby forests, as well as driftwood. Some residents also had barns and raised livestock. Tanner's Spring likely supplied the Village with fresh water.

=== Community institutions ===
The economic and cultural stability of Seneca Village enabled the growth of several community institutions. The village had three churches, two schools, and three cemeteries; by 1855, approximately two-thirds of the inhabitants were regular churchgoers. Two of the churches, First African Methodist Episcopal Zion Church of Yorkville and African Union Church, were all-Black churches, while All Angels' Church was racially mixed.

The AME Zion Church, a denomination officially established in lower Manhattan in 1821, owned property for burials in Seneca Village beginning in 1827. The Seneca Village congregation was known as the AME Zion Branch Militant from 1848. In 1853, the Church established a congregation and built a church building in Seneca Village. AME Zion maintained a church school in its basement. The church building was destroyed as part of the razing of Seneca Village.

The African Union Church, a Methodist denomination, purchased lots in Seneca Village in 1837, about 100 feet (30 m) from AME Zion Church. It had 50 congregants. There was also a branch of the African Free School next to the African Union Church, founded in the mid-1840s, which had become Colored School No. 3 as part of the public school system by the 1850s, serving 75 students. The school was led by teacher Caroline W. Simpson.

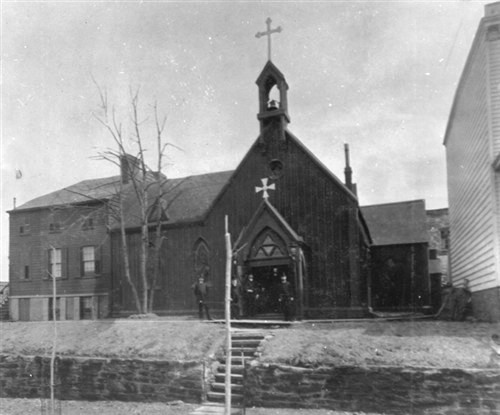
All Angels' Church in 1887, after the church building was physically relocated.

All Angels' Church was founded in 1846 as an affiliate of St. Michael's Episcopal Church, a wealthy white church whose main campus was located at Amsterdam Avenue and 99th Street in the Bloomingdale District. St. Michael's had earlier established a Sunday school in the area in 1833, founded by William Richmond and led by his brother James Cook Richmond as part of a church mission to Seneca Village and nearby areas, and accommodating at first forty children. Initially the church was hosted in a white policeman's home, but a wooden church at 84th Street was built in 1849. The congregation was racially diverse, with Black and German Protestant parishioners from Seneca Village and nearby areas. It had only 30 parishioners from Seneca Village. There was a cemetery set up to serve the congregation, which was much used during the 1849 cholera epidemic, but was closed by city law in 1851 along with all cemeteries south of 86th Street; St. Michael's Cemetery in Queens was established thereafter as a replacement for this and other communities. When the community was razed, the church was physically relocated a few blocks west and was officially incorporated at the corner of 81st Street and West End Avenue.

== Nearby settlements ==
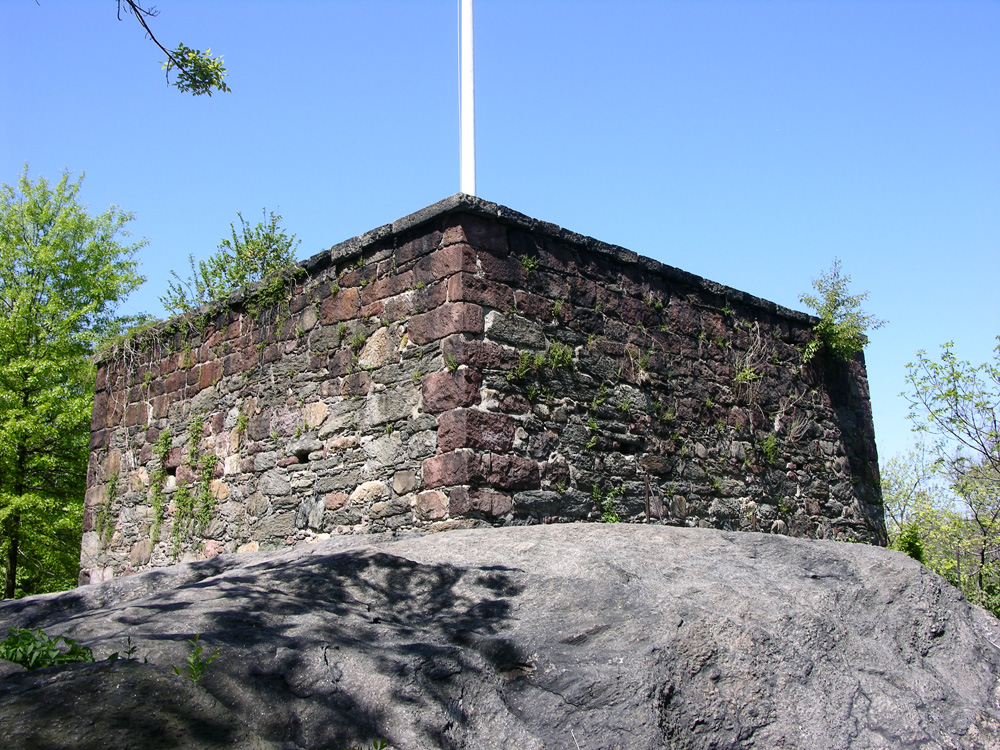
Blockhouse No. 1, a structure that predated Central Park

While Seneca Village was the largest former settlement in what is now Central Park, it was also surrounded by smaller areas that were occupied mainly by Irish and German immigrants. One of these areas, called "Pigtown", was a settlement of 14 mostly Irish families located in the modern park's southeastern corner, and was so named because the residents kept hogs and goats. Pigtown was originally located farther south, from Sixth to Seventh Avenues somewhere within the "50s"-numbered streets, but was forced northward because of complaints about the pungent animal smells. An additional 34 families, mainly Irish, lived in an area bounded by 68th and 72nd Streets between Seventh and Eighth Avenues. Nearby, on the current site of Tavern on the Green, were a collection of bone-boiling plants, which employed people from Seneca Village and nearby settlements. To the southwest of Seneca Village was the settlement of Harsenville, which is now part of the Upper West Side between 66th and 81st Streets.

There were also two German settlements: one at the modern-day park's northern end and one south of the current Jacqueline Kennedy Onassis Reservoir. Many of the Irish and German residents were also farmers with their own gardens. An additional settlement in the northeast corner of Central Park included a portion of the former Boston Post Road. That corner contains McGowan's Pass, a topological feature that was the site of a Hessian encampment during the American Revolutionary War, and Blockhouse No. 1, a still-extant fortification built during the War of 1812. Mount St. Vincent's Academy was also sited near McGowan's Pass until 1881. A later Irish settlement was known as "Goatville".

== Demise ==
=== Planning of Central Park ===
By the 1840s, members of the city's upper class were publicly calling for the construction of a new large park in Manhattan. Two of the primary proponents were William Cullen Bryant, the editor of the New York Evening Post, and Andrew Jackson Downing, one of the first American landscape designers. The Special Committee on Parks was formed to survey possible sites for the proposed large park. One of the first sites considered was Jones's Wood, a 160-acre (65 ha) tract of land between 66th and 75th Streets on the Upper East Side. The area was occupied by multiple wealthy families who objected to the taking of their land, particularly the Jones and Schermerhorn families. Downing stated that he would prefer a park of at least 500 acres (200 ha) at any location from 39th Street to the Harlem River. Following the passage of an 1851 bill to acquire Jones's Wood, the Schermerhorns and Joneses successfully obtained an injunction to block the acquisition, and the transaction was invalidated as unconstitutional.

The second site proposed for a large public park was a 750-acre (300 ha) area labeled "Central Park", bounded by 59th and 106th Streets between Fifth and Eighth Avenues. The Central Park plan gradually gained support from a variety of groups. After a second bill to acquire Jones's Wood was nullified, the New York State Legislature passed the Central Park Act in July 1853; the act authorized a board of five commissioners to start purchasing land for a park, and it created a Central Park Fund to raise money.

In the years prior to the acquisition of Central Park, the Seneca Village community was referred to in pejorative terms, including racial slurs. Park advocates and the press began to describe Seneca Village and other communities in this area as "shantytowns" and the residents there as "squatters" and "vagabonds and scoundrels"; the Irish and Black residents were often described as "wretched" and "debased". The residents of Seneca Village were also accused of stealing food and operating illegal bars. The village's detractors included Egbert Ludovicus Viele, the park's first engineer, who wrote a report about the "refuge of five thousand squatters" living on the future site of Central Park, criticizing the residents as people with "very little knowledge of the English language, and with very little respect for the law". Other critics described the inhabitants as "stubborn insects" and used racial slurs to refer to Seneca Village. While a minority of Seneca Village's residents were landowners, most residents had formal or informal agreements with landlords; only a few residents were actual squatters with no permission from any landlord.

=== Razing ===
In 1853, the Central Park commissioners started conducting property assessments on more than 34,000 lots in and near Central Park. The Central Park commissioners had completed their assessments by July 1855, and the New York State Supreme Court confirmed this work the following February. All land owners and long-term lease holders did receive compensation. However, roughly only 20% of those living in Seneca Village owned land. As part of the tax assessment, owners were offered an average of $700 for their property. These financial settlements were not without contention. For instance, Andrew Williams was paid $2,335 for his house and three lots, and even though he had originally asked for $3,500, the final compensation still represented a significant increase over the $125 that he had paid for the property in 1825.

Clearing occurred as soon as the Central Park commission's report was released in October 1855. The city began enforcing little-known regulations and forcing Seneca Village residents to pay rent. Members of the community fought to retain their land. For two years, residents protested and filed lawsuits to halt the sale of their land. However, in mid-1856, Mayor Fernando Wood prevailed, and residents of Seneca Village were given final notices. In 1857, the city government acquired all private property within Seneca Village through eminent domain, and on October 1, city officials in New York reported that the last holdouts living on land that was to become Central Park had been removed. A newspaper account at the time suggested that Seneca Village would "not be forgotten ... [as] many a brilliant and stirring fight was had during the campaign. But the supremacy of the law was upheld by the policeman's bludgeons."

All of the inhabitants of the village were evicted by 1857, and all of the properties within Central Park were razed. The only institution from Seneca Village to survive was All Angels' Church, which relocated a couple of blocks away, albeit with an entirely new congregation except for one person. There are few records of where residents went after their eviction, as the community was entirely destroyed. In the 20th century, no one had been identified as a descendant of a Seneca Village resident. A later call for descendants found the lineage of first land purchaser Andrew Williams, who has been the namesake for successive generations of his family until the present day, as documented by family genealogist Ariel Williams.

Elsewhere in Central Park, the impact of eviction was less intense. Some residents, such as foundry owner Edward Snowden, simply relocated elsewhere. Squatters and hog farmers were the most affected by Central Park's construction, as they were never compensated for their evictions. Some traces of Seneca Village persisted in later years. As workers were uprooting trees at the corner of 85th Street and Central Park West in 1871, they came upon two coffins, both containing Black people from Seneca Village. A half-century later, a gardener named Gilhooley inadvertently found a graveyard from Seneca Village while turning soil at the same site, subsequently called "Gilhooley's Burial Plot" after him.

== Rediscovery ==
The settlement was largely forgotten for more than a century after its demolition. It came to the attention of Peter Salwen in the late 1970s, who noted a discrepancy in city maps of the village's impressive architecture that belied its negative reputation, and he included it in his 1989 Upper West Side Story. Public interest in Seneca Village was invigorated after the publication of Roy Rosenzweig and Elizabeth Blackmar's 1992 book The Park and the People: A History of Central Park, which described the community extensively. Seneca Village was also the subject of a 1997 New-York Historical Society exhibition. The historical example of Seneca Village has been cited in the context of racialized community displacement and more recent urban renewal initiatives.

=== Commemoration ===
The Seneca Village Project was formed in 1998 as a collaboration between Cynthia Copeland of the New-York Historical Society, Nan Rothschild of Barnard College, and Diana Wall of City College of New York, and was later organized under the non-profit Institute for the Exploration of Seneca Village History. It is dedicated to raising awareness about Seneca Village's significance as a free, middle-class Black community in 19th-century New York City. The project facilitates educational programs, which engage school children, teachers, and the general public, and bring Seneca Village into public knowledge.

In February 2001, former Parks Commissioner Henry Stern, State Senator David Paterson, Borough President C. Virginia Fields, and New York Historical Society Executive Director Betsy Gotbaum unveiled a plaque commemorating the site where Seneca Village once stood. The plaque is located near the modern-day Mariners Playground, near 85th Street and Central Park West.

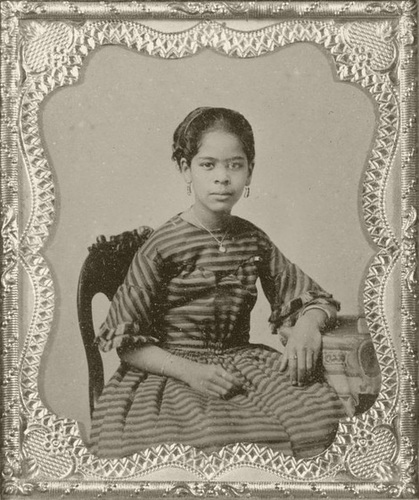
Maritcha Remond Lyons came from a family owning property in Seneca Village.

In 2019, the city announced a request for proposals for a statue honoring the Lyons family, property owners in the village: Albro Lyons Sr. (another member of the New York African Society for Mutual Relief) and Mary Joseph Lyons (née Marshall) and their children, most notably Maritcha Remond Lyons. The statue would be placed at 106th Street in the North Woods section of the park, and has received funding from several private donors including the Andrew W. Mellon Foundation, Ford Foundation, JPB Foundation, and Laurie M. Tisch Illumination Fund.

Also in 2019, the outdoor exhibit "Discover Seneca Village" opened with temporary historical markers at points across the Seneca Village landscape of Central Park. The exhibit was originally scheduled to run until October 2020, but its run was extended.

=== Archaeological excavations ===
Following the 1997 exhibition "'Before Central Park: The Life and Death of Seneca Village" at the New-York Historical Society, Wall, Rothschild, Copeland, and Herbert Seignoret decided to see if any archaeological traces of the village remained. They worked with local historians, churches, and community groups to shape the direction of their research project on the site. In June 2000, Wall, Rothschild, Copeland, and other researchers started performing imaging tests to determine if any traces of Seneca Village remained. With student participation, the project conducted exhaustive archival research and preliminary remote sensing. Researchers used soil boring to identify promising areas with undisturbed soil. In 2005, the team used ground-penetrating radar to successfully locate traces of Seneca Village. After extended discussions with the New York City Department of Parks and the Central Park Conservancy, researchers were granted permission for test excavations in the regions of the village thought most likely to contain intact archaeological deposits.

Digs took place in 2004, August 2005, and mid-2011. The 2011 excavation uncovered the foundation walls and cellar deposits of the home of William Godfrey Wilson, a sexton for All Angels' Church, and a deposit of items in the backyard of two other Seneca Village residents. Archaeologists filled over 250 bags with artifacts, including the bone handle of a toothbrush and the leather sole of a child's shoe. In 2020, the New York City Landmarks Preservation Commission launched an online exhibit, Seneca Village Unearthed, with around 300 artifacts from the 2011 excavation. The 2025 project Envisioning Seneca Village produced a virtual 3D model of the historic landscape.

=== Art and culture ===
Keith Josef Adkins's play The People Before the Park had its first performances at Premiere Stages in 2015. Marilyn Nelson's poetry collection My Seneca Village was published the same year.

Before Yesterday We Could Fly, a period-room exhibition at the Metropolitan Museum of Art, opened in 2021. The period room in the exhibit recreates the house of a fictional Seneca Village resident as it may have existed at the time, but also how their descendants may have lived in the present and future, as if the settlement had not been destroyed. The latter parts are influenced by Afrofuturism, an art genre, aesthetic, and philosophy which imagines possible futures through the lens of the African diaspora, touching on themes of imagination, self-determination, technology, and liberation.

The history of Seneca Village was chronicled in a play staged by Kean University in 2015, The People Before the Park. The animated musical sitcom Central Park (2020) references Seneca Village in its first episode, with the ensemble referring to it as a "dark chapter" of the park's history.

== See also ==
- Land of the Blacks (Manhattan)
- List of freedmen's towns
  - Allensworth, California
  - American Beach, Florida
  - Brooklyn, Illinois
  - Bruce's Beach
  - Butler Beach
  - Fargo, Arkansas
  - Five Points, Denver
  - Glenarden, Maryland
  - Goldsboro, Florida
  - Greenwood District, Tulsa
  - Hayti, Durham, North Carolina
  - Highland Beach, Maryland
  - Hogan's Alley, Vancouver
  - Idlewild, Michigan
  - North Brentwood, Maryland
  - Kowaliga, Alabama
  - Liberia, South Carolina
  - Mound Bayou, Mississippi
  - Robbins, Illinois
  - Rosewood, Florida
  - Slocum, Texas
  - Sparrow's Beach
  - Weeksville, Brooklyn
  - Wilmington, North Carolina
