= Reynolds Arcade (1829–1932) =

Commercial building in Rochester, New York, 1829–1932

Coordinates: 43°09′23″N 77°36′44″W

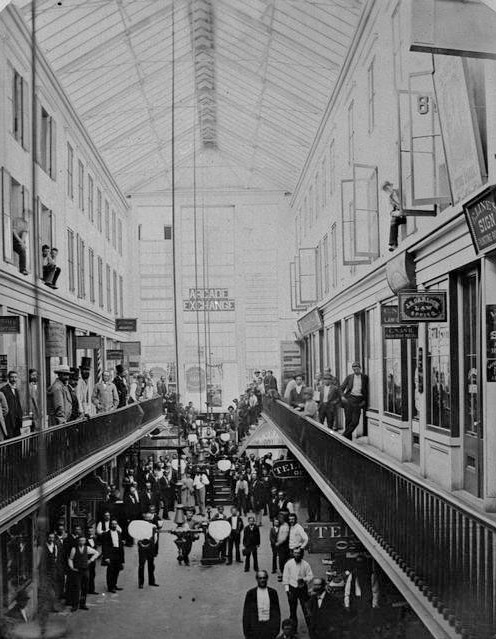
Reynolds Arcade interior in 1877

The Reynolds Arcade (1829–1932) was a commercial building constructed by Abelard Reynolds in 1829 on Buffalo Street (now Main Street) in Rochester, New York. According to Joseph W. Barnes, a Rochester City Historian, it was, "the center of Rochester downtown life for more than a century." After it was demolished, an office building with the same name was constructed on the same site.

Built of brick, it was four-and-a-half stories tall and almost 100 feet wide. It contained 86 rooms arranged on either side of a 15-foot-wide, skylighted corridor that extended from the primary entrance on Main Street to the rear entrance on the next street to the north. On top, it had an observation tower, and it had 14 cellars.

It housed six stores that opened directly onto Main Street. The other shops and offices on the first floor opened into the interior corridor, while those on the second floor opened onto a balconied gallery that overlooked the corridor. Hotel rooms were on the upper floors. The town post office was in the building, enhancing the arcade's role as the city hub. When Rochester received its city charter in 1834, the inauguration ceremony for its first mayor, Jonathan Child, was held in the Reynolds Arcade.

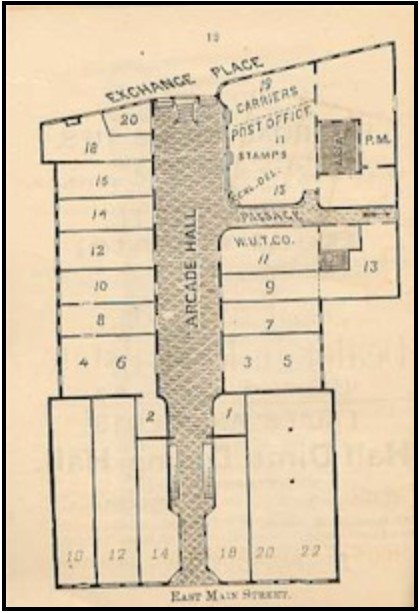
Floor plan of the Reynolds Arcade

In later years, the arcade served as the main entranceway to Corinthian Hall, which was built by Reynolds in 1849 and located across the street from the arcade's rear entrance. The hall was a prominent location for lectures, concerts, plays, balls, parties and fairs.

Directly across the street from the arcade's Main Street entrance was the office of the North Star, the abolitionist newspaper operated by Frederick Douglass. Douglass, who had escaped from slavery, delivered his "What to the Slave Is the Fourth of July?" speech in 1852 in Corinthian Hall, a speech that one biographer called, "perhaps the greatest antislavery oration ever given."

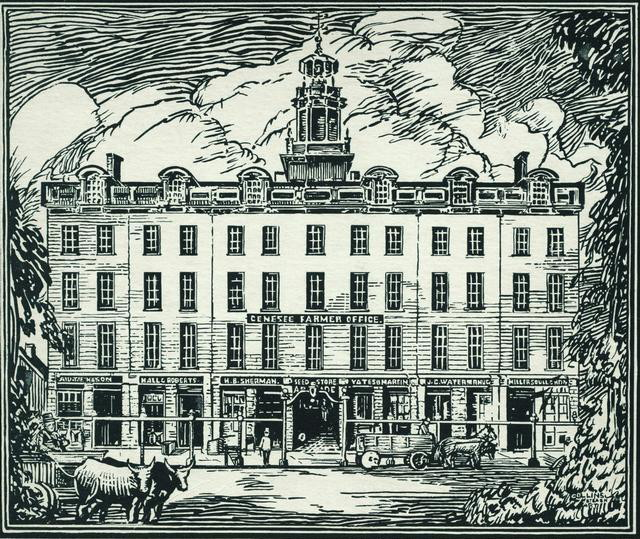
Main Street façade of the Reynolds Arcade

Two major corporations trace their origins to the Reynolds Arcade. The headquarters of the young Western Union telegraph company was located in the arcade from 1856 to 1866. Western Union eventually became the dominant telegraph company in the United States. Bausch & Lomb, which grew into one of the world's largest eye-care companies, began in 1853 as a daguerreotype shop in the Reynolds Arcade. The shop sold eyeglasses at first as a sideline, but after the two partners devised a way to make eyeglass frames that cost less, eye care products became the focus of their business.

The arcade was the scene of abolitionist activity by both blacks and whites who owned businesses there, including the Francis and Cleggett barber shop. Benjamin Cleggett, whose father had escaped from slavery, worked as a barber in Rochester before moving to Geneva, New York. He married Frances Nell, whose brother, William Cooper Nell, worked in Douglass's North Star newspaper office.

The arcade was home to the Reynolds Library, the city's main reference library, from 1886 until the arcade was demolished. The Reynolds Library was then merged with the Rochester Public Library.

By the 1920s, the arcade was becoming increasingly outdated in addition to being a fire hazard. It was demolished in 1932 and replaced the following year by a ten-story office building that, in honor of its predecessor, was also named the Reynolds Arcade.
