= Corinthian Hall =

Corinthian Hall may refer to:

- Corinthian Hall (Rochester, New York)
- Kansas City Museum, whose main building is Corinthian Hall

== See also ==
- Corinthian wall
