= Corinthian Hall (Rochester, New York) =

Meeting hall in Rochester, New York, 1849–1898

Coordinates: 43°09′23″N 77°36′44″W

Corinthian Hall was a meeting hall in Rochester, New York, that was the site of significant speeches and other events. It was built in 1849 and was destroyed by a fire in 1898.

== Structure ==
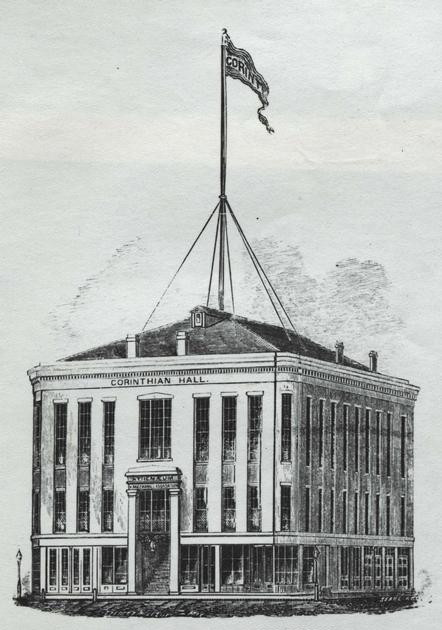
Corinthian Hall

Corinthian Hall, built in 1849, was a prominent location in Rochester, New York for lectures, concerts, plays, balls, parties and fairs. Susan B. Anthony, who spoke for many years in lecture halls across the country, said that Corinthian Hall, "at the time of its erection was the most magnificent auditorium west of the Hudson."

The hall was located on the top floor of a building designed by architect Henry Searle and built by William A. Reynolds. The building was just north of the Reynolds Arcade, also built by William Reynolds.

Most people entered the building through the Reynolds Arcade, which was located on the site of what today is a newer building, also called Reynolds Arcade, at 16 East Main Street. That entrance was near two sites of historical interest. Directly across the street was the office of the North Star, the abolitionist newspaper operated by Frederick Douglass. On their way through the arcade, patrons of Corinthian Hall passed by the headquarters of Western Union, a rapidly growing telegraph company.

The building was constructed for the Rochester Athenaeum and Mechanics Association, which later developed into the Rochester Institute of Technology. The building housed the association's 5000-volume library. Retail establishments and a volunteer fire company were on the first floor.

In 1879, Corinthian Hall was remodeled and named the Academy of Music. In 1884, a second gallery was added to bring the seating capacity up to sixteen hundred. In 1898, it was destroyed by fire. The short street where the hall was located is now called Corinthian Street.

== Significant events ==
Frederick Douglass, an African American abolitionist leader who had escaped from slavery, delivered his "What to the Slave Is the Fourth of July?" speech in Corinthian Hall on July 5, 1852. One biographer called it "perhaps the greatest antislavery oration ever given." Douglass told his audience that, "This Fourth of July is yours, not mine. You may rejoice, I must mourn."

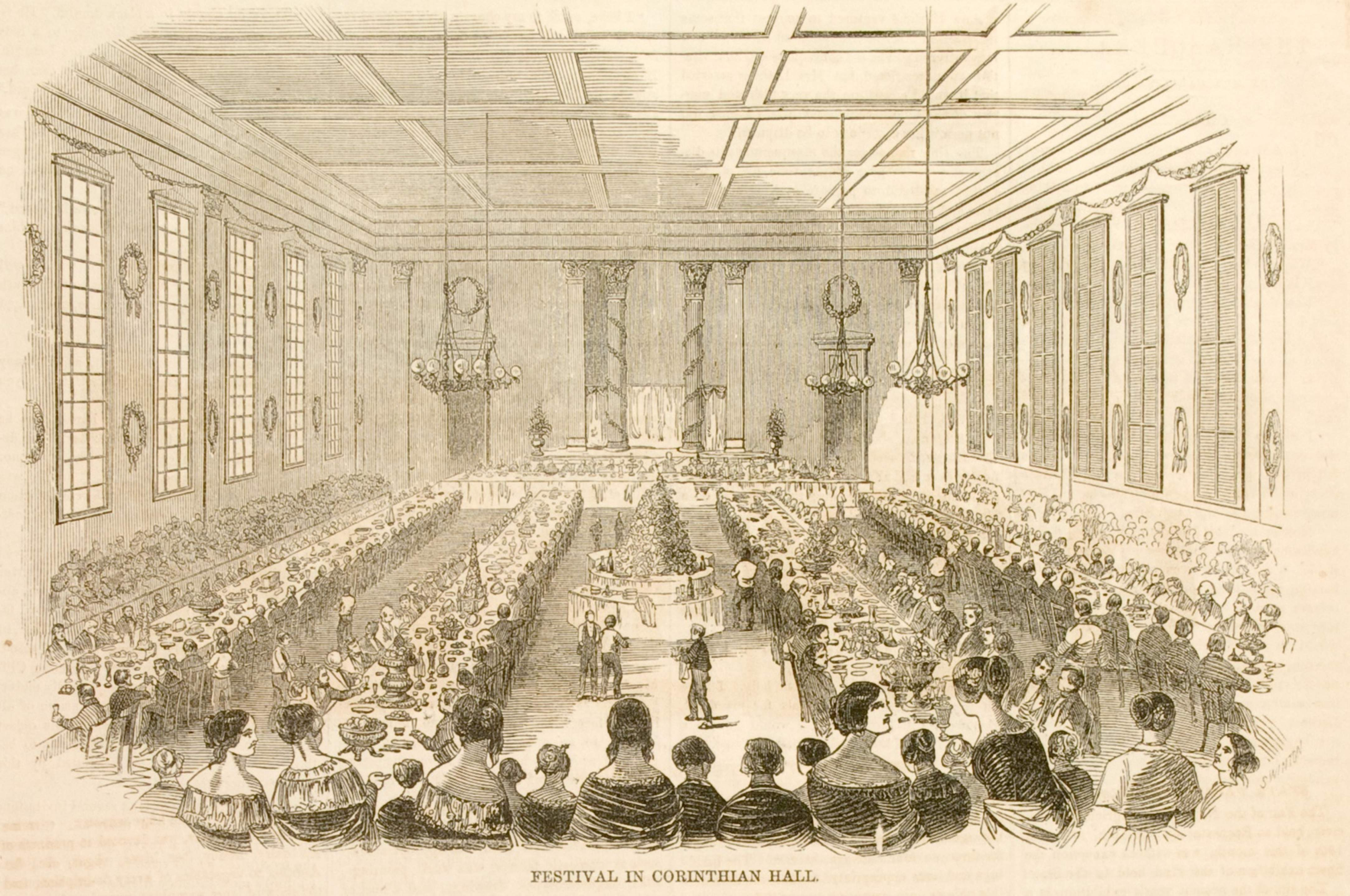
Festival in Corinthian Hall

U.S. Senator William H. Seward, who went on to become Secretary of State under President Abraham Lincoln, delivered what became known as his "Irrepressible Conflict" speech in Corinthian Hall in October, 1858. He said a dangerous conflict over slavery was developing that would eventually lead the U.S. to "become entirely either a slave-holding nation, or entirely a free-labor nation." According to one history of the Civil War period, "Regardless of the region, party affiliation, or stand on the slavery issue – or any issue – just about every newspaper in the country commented on the speech."

Susan B. Anthony, an abolitionist and women's suffrage leader who lived in Rochester, organized several events in the hall. When John Brown was executed in 1859 for leading a violent raid on the U.S. arsenal at Harper's Ferry in what he hoped would be the beginning of an armed slave uprising, Anthony organized a meeting of "mourning and indignation" in the hall on the day of his execution. In January 1861, Anthony delivered an abolitionist speech at the hall that was disrupted by a mob, requiring her to be escorted from the building by the police for her own safety. In 1878, the National Woman Suffrage Association, led by Anthony, held its annual meeting in Rochester to commemorate the thirtieth anniversary of the first women's rights convention, which was held in nearby Seneca Falls. The closing session of the 1878 convention was held in the presence of a large audience in Corinthian Hall.

Other notable figures who appeared at Corinthian Hall include novelist Charles Dickens; singer Jenny Lind, the "Swedish Nightingale;" minister and social reformer Henry Ward Beecher; and philosopher and essayist Ralph Waldo Emerson.
