= Natural slavery =

Aristotle's belief that some people are slaves by nature

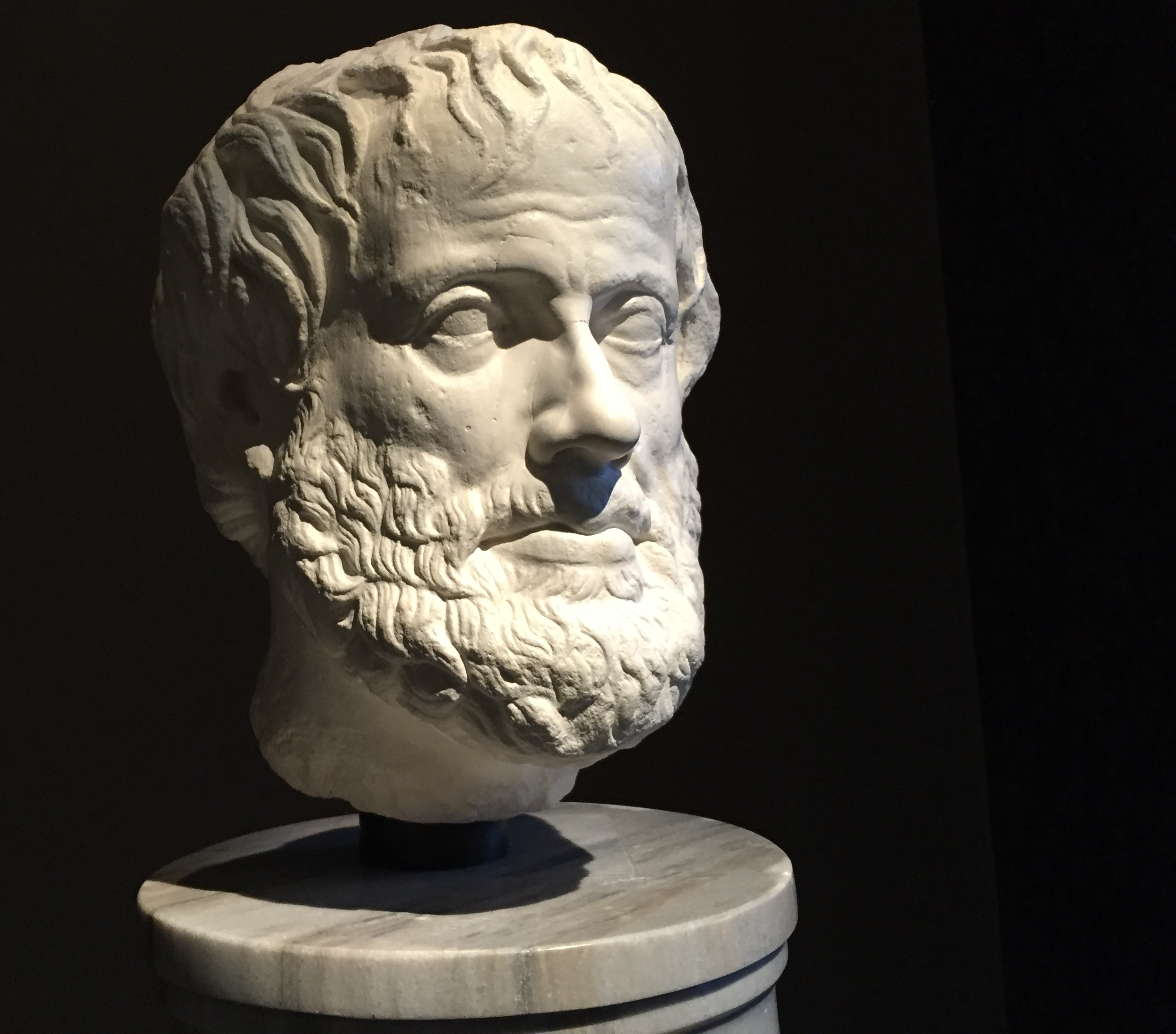
Head of Aristotle, Roman copy according to Greek original around 320 BC, marble.

Natural slavery (or Aristotelian slavery) is the argument set forth in Aristotle's Politics that some people are slaves by nature, while others are slaves solely by law or convention.It was frequently misquoted and misinterpreted intentionally or unintentionally to fit certain agendas through out the ages.

== Aristotle's discourse on slavery ==
In his work, the Politics, Aristotle describes a natural slave as "anyone who, while being human, is by nature not his own but of someone else" and further states "he is of someone else when, while being human, he is a piece of property; and a piece of property is a tool for action separate from its owner." From this, Aristotle defines natural slavery in two phases. The first is the natural slave's existence and characteristics. The second is the natural slave in society and in interaction with their master. According to Aristotle, natural slaves' main features include being pieces of property, tools for actions, and belonging to others.

In book I of the Politics, Aristotle addresses the questions of whether slavery can be natural or whether all slavery is contrary to nature and whether it is better for some people to be slaves. He concludes that

those who are as different [from other men] as the soul from the body or man from beast—and they are in this state if their work is the use of the body, and if this is the best that can come from them—are slaves by nature. For them it is better to be ruled in accordance with this sort of rule, if such is the case for the other things mentioned.

It is not advantageous for one to be held in slavery who is not a natural slave, Aristotle contends, claiming that such a condition is sustained solely by force and results in enmity.

Aristotle's work has come under controversy and criticism in recent years. According to Darrell Dobbs, there is a "general consensus that the formulation of Aristotle's account of slavery is riddled with inconsistency and incoherence." Other scholars have argued that the state of natural slavery is ultimately alterable, since Aristotle's conception of nature is as well.

== Influence ==
Stoic thought disagreed with the Aristotelian concept of natural slavery, as it was expressed in Seneca's Letter 47 and elsewhere.

During the 16th century, as the Americas began to be colonized, the debate over the enslavement of the native peoples grew. Many colonizers supported enslavement and went to great lengths to morally justify it. Bartolomé de las Casas was in favor of peacefully converting native peoples without enslaving them. Las Casas protested the treatment of natives by Spaniards, and in 1520 was granted an audience with the Holy Roman Emperor Charles V (Charles I of Spain). He asked instead for their peaceful conversion.

In April 1550, Las Casas and Juan Ginés de Sepúlveda met in Spain for a debate on the rationalization of native American enslavement and its morality based on Aristotle's idea of natural slavery. Sepúlveda defended the position of the New World colonists, claiming that the Amerindians were "natural slaves". Las Casas countered that Aristotle's definition of the "barbarian" and the natural slave did not apply to the Indians, who were fully capable of reason and should be brought to Christianity without force or coercion. Sepúlveda reasoned that the enslavement of natives was a result of war: the "superior" was dominating the "inferior", and the Spaniards had every right to do so.

== See also ==
- Natural law
- Natural order (philosophy)
- Slavery
- Slavery and religion
- Slavery in ancient Greece
- Valladolid debate
