= Albro Lyons Sr. =

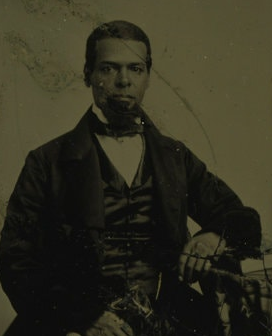
Lyons, c. 1850

Albro Lyons Sr. was a Black New Yorker of mixed heritage who advocated for educational opportunities and worked to free slaves. There is a double ambrotype of he and his wife, Mary. His daughter Maritcha Remond Lyons wrote a memoir about the family.

His boarding house for seamen was an important stop on the Underground Railroad. He was a member of the New York African Society for Mutual Relief.

His son Albro Lyons Jr. lived from 1854 until 1906.
