= St. Michael's Episcopal Church (Manhattan) =

Church in Manhattan, New York

- St. Michael's Church
- U.S. National Register of Historic Places
- New York State Register of Historic Places
- New York City Landmark
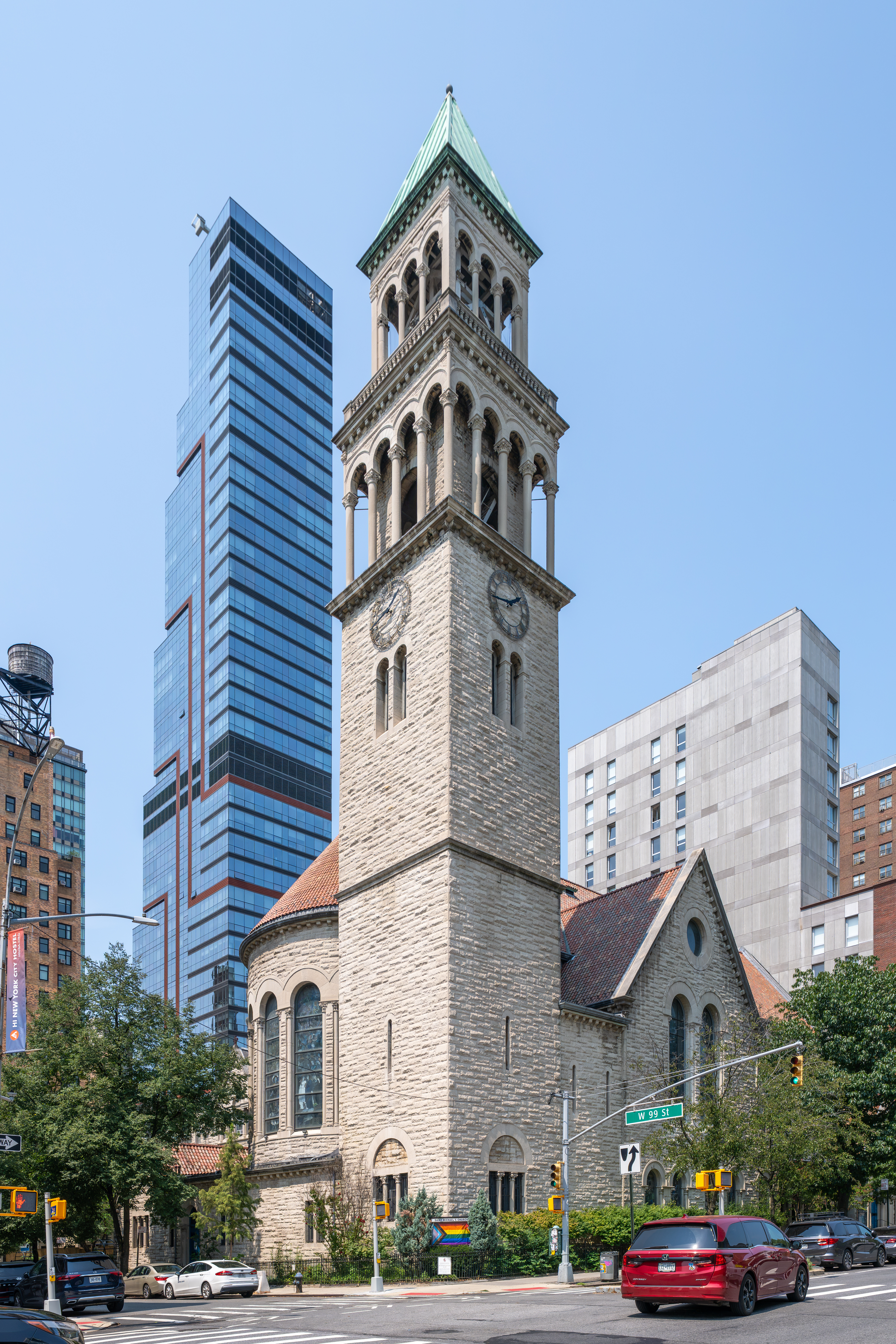
- (2026)

- Location within Manhattan Location within New York City Location within New York Location within the United States
- Location: 225 W. 99th St., New York, New York
- Coordinates: 40°47′46″N 73°58′10″W
- Built: 1890–91
- Architect: Robert W. Gibson
- Architectural style: Romanesque Revival, Renaissance Revival
- NRHP reference No.: 96001354
- NYSRHP No.: 06101.008526
- NYCL No.: 2281

Significant dates
- Added to NRHP: November 15, 1996
- Designated NYSRHP: October 4, 1996
- Designated NYCL: April 12, 2016

St. Michael's Church is a historic Episcopal church at 225 West 99th Street and Amsterdam Avenue on Manhattan's Upper West Side in New York City. The parish was founded on the present site in January 1807, at that time in the rural Bloomingdale District. The present limestone Romanesque building, the third on the site, was built in 1890–91 to designs by Robert W. Gibson and added to the National Register of Historic Places in 1996.

The church building also is noted for its Tiffany stained glass and its two tracker-action pipe organs built in 1967 by the Rudolph von Beckerath Organ Company (Hamburg, Germany).

In addition to traditional Anglican services, St. Michael's has services and prayer groups influenced by the emerging church movement.

Sale of air rights that enabled the building of The Ariel apartment buildings allowed St. Michael's to finance a major restoration.

On April 12, 2016, the church, parish house and rectory were designated landmarks by the New York City Landmarks Preservation Commission.

The church reported 701 members in 2019 and 499 members in 2023; no membership statistics were reported in 2024 parochial reports. Plate and pledge income reported for the congregation in 2024 was $758,769 with average Sunday attendance (ASA) of 150 persons.

== History ==
Almost uniquely among upper Manhattan's houses of worship, St. Michael's Church has been located on exactly the same site for two centuries.

The first building was a simple white frame structure with a belfry, built for pewholders of Trinity Church, Wall Street, who sought a more convenient place to worship near their summer homes overlooking the Hudson River amid the farms on what is now Manhattan's Upper West Side. At that time the City of New York was confined to the southern tip of Manhattan. Among the congregation was Elizabeth Schuyler Hamilton, widow of Alexander Hamilton. A second, larger, Carpenter Gothic building was in use from 1854 to 1891. In the 1840s and 50s the Rev. Thomas McClure Peters extended a missionary church in the racially integrated settlement of Seneca Village, demolished to make way for Central Park. In the 1850s the Rector's wife Mrs. William Richmond transformed the John McVickar house, formerly the center of a sixty-acre estate south of St. Michael's, for a Protestant Episcopal "home for abandoned women who found no hand outstretched to help them". Subsequently, the church was served by Peters' son and grandson, John Punnett Peters. Altogether, the three generations of Peters led the parish for 99 years.

The third and current building, influenced by the Romanesque and Byzantine styles and designed to seat 1,500 people, was dedicated in December, 1891. The church stands on ground formerly used as a cemetery. In building the church it was decided not to disturb it. Among those still buried there are the Rev. Mr. Richmond, the first rector of the church. The last interment took place in 1872. The present church was erected after an elevated railroad was built on Columbus Avenue absorbing the rural district into the growing city.

In 1895, Louis Comfort Tiffany (1848–1933) was commissioned to design and install the seven great lancet windows representing St. Michael's Victory in Heaven, along with a marble altar. Twenty-five years later, Tiffany's overall design scheme was completed with the Chapel of the Angels reredos mosaic depicting the Witnesses of the Redemption. From the 1890s through the 1920s, parishioners donated stained glass windows of eclectic styles.

In 1997 St. Michael's Church became a Designated Historical Building on the National Register of Historic Places and the New York State Register of Historic Places.

Its rectory stands at the head of the former St. Michael's Lane: St. Michael's Lane may still be traced in mid-block back alleys and service access between apartment buildings for several blocks south of 91st Street.

== Architecture ==
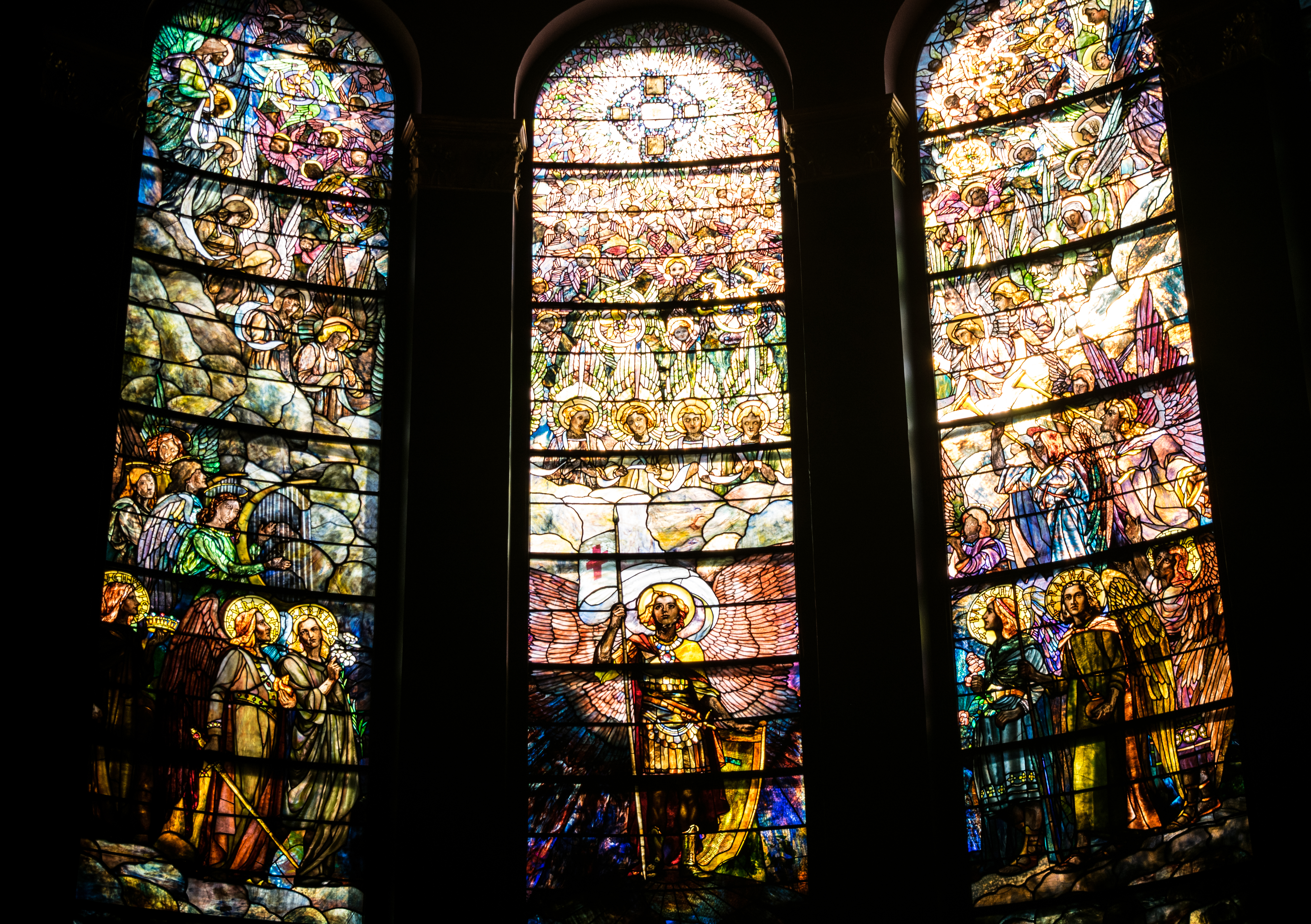
"St. Michael's Victory in Heaven" windows depict the seven archangels Jehudiel, Uriel, Gabriel, Michael, Barachiel, Raphael, Sealtiel and other celestial beings.

The church was designed by architect Robert W. Gibson. The square, Romanesque bell tower rises 160 feet.

Tiffany studios created many works of art for the congregation. After the church building was completed, seven windows were commissioned and installed showing "St. Michael's Victory in Heaven." Louis Comfort Tiffany designed the windows which were made in his studios with the assistance of artists Clara W. Parrish, Edward P. Sperry, Louis J. Lederle and Joseph Lauber. Two additional Tiffany stained glass windows were later installed in the Chapel of the Angels, in addition to a large Tiffany mosaic behind the altar. Tiffany decorations in the main sanctuary include a white Vermont marble altar, altar rail, and pulpit and the dome of the apse. The many Tiffany features were installed between 1891 and 1920. The windows were restored in 1990. After the windows were restored, the church had the entire interior painted by Fine Art Decoration of New York with the architectural details picked out in an array of colors drawn from the windows and mosaics.

== Organ ==
A Rudolf von Beckerath organ was installed in 1967.

== Impact ==
For most of its existence, and continuing today, St. Michael's has influenced the physical and social development of New York City. St. Michael's founded at least six New York churches, including All Angels' Church, located first in Seneca Village, in what is now Central Park, and later on West End Avenue. After the Civil War, St. Michael's provided space and financial support for the free Bloomingdale Clinic, District Nurse Association, Day Nursery and Circulating Library.

In the 1980s the congregation had dwindled to thirty, but by 1987 it was up to three hundred, thanks in large part to the energies of the Rev. Frederick Hill, who retired in 1992 and died in 1997. St. Michael's is known for its wide range of programs and for its congregation's wide ethnic, socio-economic, and sexual orientation diversity. The church draws people from all areas of New York City and its surroundings.

In 2013, the church had five choirs and more than 100 children involved in the Christian Formation Program. Social ministries included work for the hungry and the homeless, the ill and their caregivers, the unemployed and their dependents. Both church and parish house provide space for extensive parish activities and major not-for-profit community organizations.

Since the early 1990s, St. Michael's has been partnered with St. Michael's, Promosa, in Matlosane, South Africa and, most recently, with the Diocese of Madras in the Church of South India.

== See also ==
- Anglican Communion
- List of New York City Designated Landmarks in Manhattan from 59th to 110th Streets
- National Register of Historic Places listings in Manhattan from 59th to 110th Streets
- St. Michael's Episcopal Church (disambiguation)
- St. Michael's Church (disambiguation)
