= Letter 47 (Seneca) =

Epistle of Seneca the Younger

Seneca the Younger's Letter 47 of his Epistulae Morales ad Lucilium, sometimes known as On Master and Slave or On Slavery, is an essayistic look at dehumanization in the context of slavery in ancient Rome. It was a criticism of aspects of Roman slavery, without outright opposition to it (Seneca was himself a slaveholder), and had a favorable later reception by Enlightenment philosophers and subsequently the 19th century abolitionist movement. Conversely, the text has also been seen as a proslavery apologia, as well as in the light of the Stoic philosophical idea that "all men are slaves".

Historical Stoicism believed in human equality by natural law, but also recognized positive law. It was in disagreement with Aristotle's earlier concept of natural slavery. As such, Seneca made objection to behavior seen as particularly degrading such as corporal punishment and sexual exploitation of enslaved people, but not to the overall social system.

== Influence ==
As a Roman letter expressing ambivalence about slavery from the 1st century, it has been compared to the early Christian writing in Paul's Epistle to Philemon. And Gregory of Nyssa in the 4th century condemns slavery outright, in rhetorical terms that may draw from Seneca, but that go beyond him.

In support of his argument, Seneca references the proverb totidem hostes esse quot servos ("as many enemies as you have slaves"), cited by many Europeans in the early Atlantic slave trade as a caution against slave rebellion.

Hegel's master–slave dialectic in The Phenomenology of Spirit of 1807 picked up the philosophical theme, later commented on by Jean-Paul Sartre and Frantz Fanon in the 20th century.

Jean-Jacques Rousseau's sequel to the 1762 Emile, or On Education sees the novel's protagonist sold into the Barbary slave trade, and develops Seneca's ideas, while taking them further to show slavery as inherently unjust. The letter is quoted in the British abolitionist William Wilberforce's 1807 A Letter on the Abolition of the Slave Trade, and is mentioned in Pierre-Suzanne-Augustin Cochin's L'Abolition de l'esclavage in 1861 amid the American Civil War. Seneca's writings were popular with African American activists, and may have inspired the naming of the free settlement of Seneca Village in early 19th century New York City, a possible influence of the African Free School. At an 1855 raid in Washington, D.C., as police asked African American activists "whether they had anything to say", an activist simply placed three books on the desk: the Bible, Life in Earnest, and Seneca's Morals, and requested their examination.
