= All Angels' Church =

Church in Manhattan, New York

Coordinates: 40°47′5.73″N 73°58′48.12″W

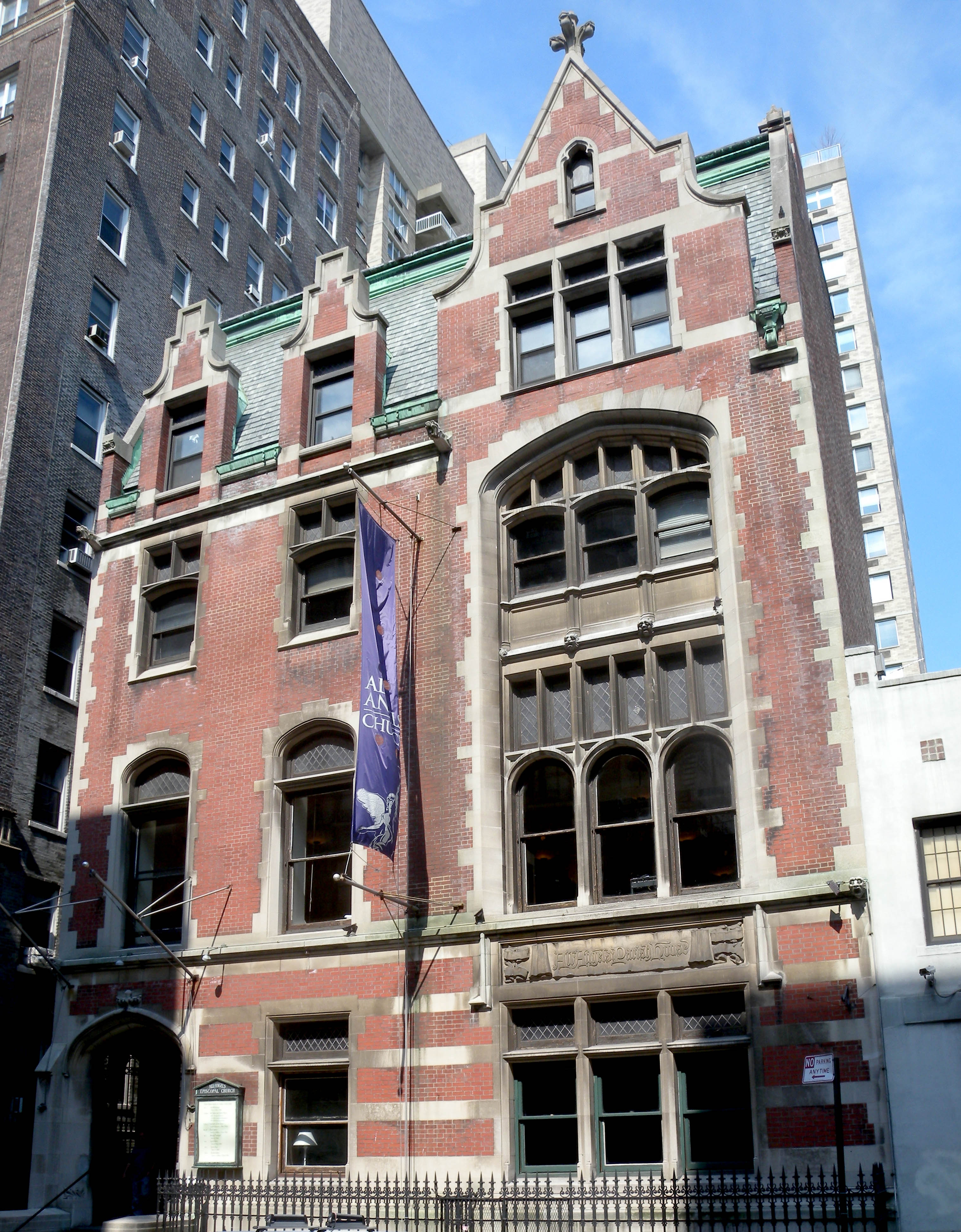
- Streetside view of All Angels'
- Interactive map of the All Angels' Church area

General information
- Location: Manhattan, New York City
- Opened: 1849
- Closed: 1979
- Demolished: 1979

All Angels' Church is located on 251 West 80th Street on the Upper West Side of Manhattan in New York City. It is a member of the Episcopal Church in the United States and the Anglican Communion worldwide.

In 2020, it reported 257 members, average attendance of 155, and $774,125 in plate and pledge income.

== History ==
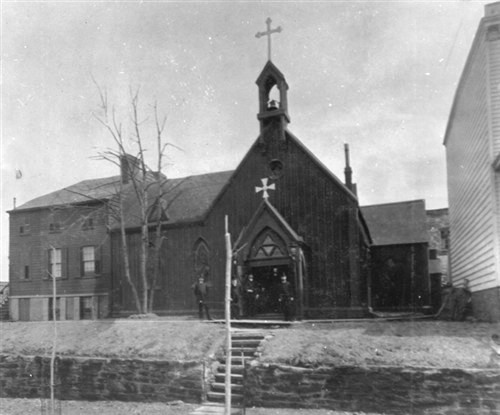
All Angels' Church in 1887, after the first church building was physically relocated from Seneca Village.

All Angels' parish was founded in the 1830s as a mission parish of St. Michael's Episcopal Church. It was established to minister to residents living in Seneca Village, a free black neighborhood which would later become a part of Central Park. The first church building was wooden and built in 1849 at 84th Street. It housed a racially mixed congregation, including freed African American slaves and recent European immigrants. Approximately 270 African American residents of Seneca Village were among the 1,600 people evicted under eminent domain during 1857, for the creation of Central Park. In the twentieth century, it was the local church of children's author Madeleine L'Engle when she was in New York City.

=== All Angels' Farm ===
Early ministry to the poor included a summer respite for mothers and children at All Angels’ Farm (a forerunner to the concept of today’s Fresh Air Fund). In 1903, the church purchased the Underhill estate at Mount Hope in the Town in Wappinger, in Dutchess County. Dr. Anthony Underhill was a physician from New York, who had purchased the land from his father-in-law, farmer William Marvin. The mansion was extended, and could eventually accommodate over 100 mothers and children. The camp project was organized by rector S. DeLancy. In 1947, All Angels Farm closed as the church had purchased other property in Ramapo, Rockland County to replace the summer camp in Wappinger.

== Building ==
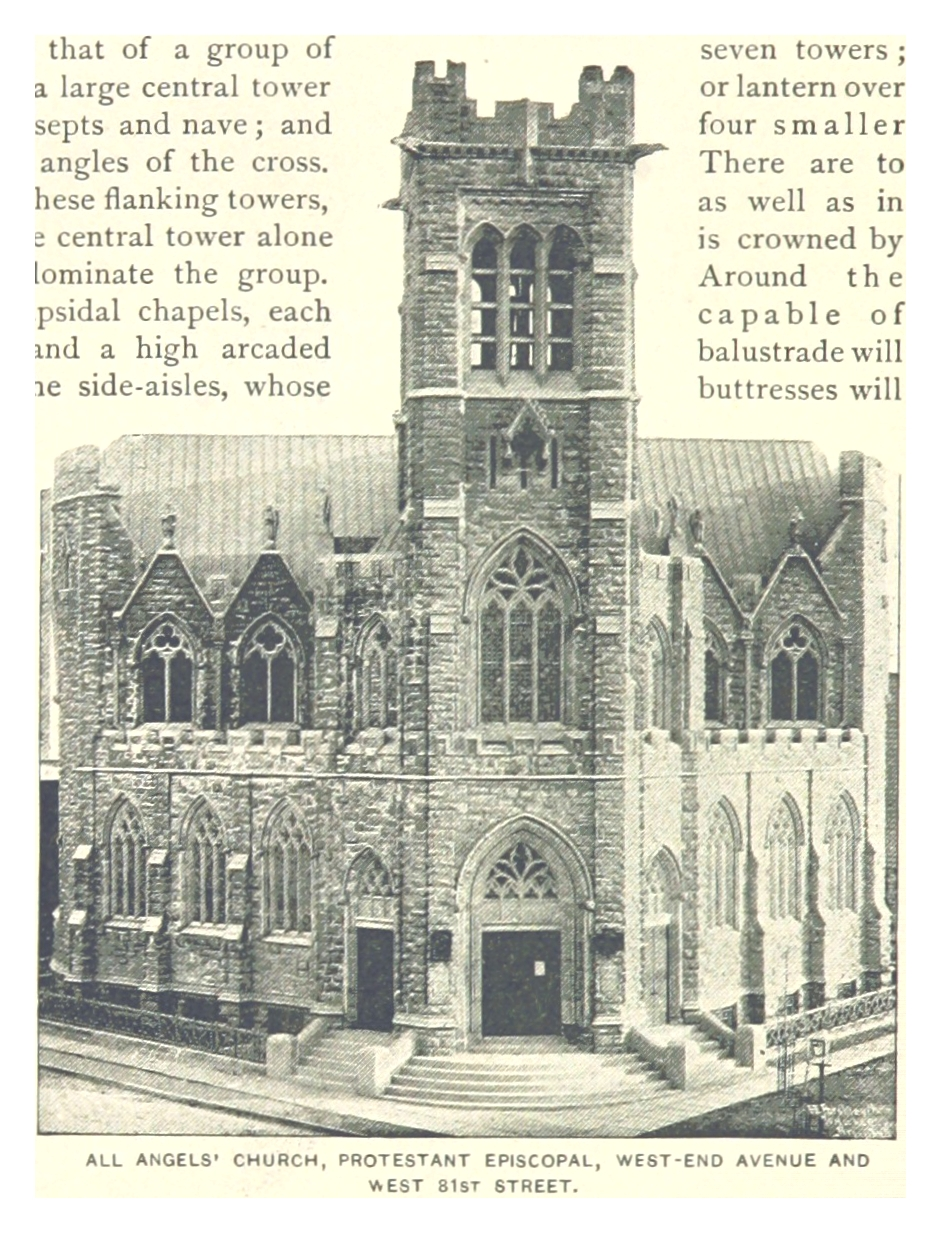
1890s

In 1856, All Angels' relocated its building from the former Seneca Village to West End Avenue and 81st Street. A new building was put up in 1890, designed by architect Samuel B. Snook of J.B. Snook & Sons. Its interior was altered in 1896 by Karl Bitter Studio. A 2005 reminiscence in The New York Times described the interior as spectacular:

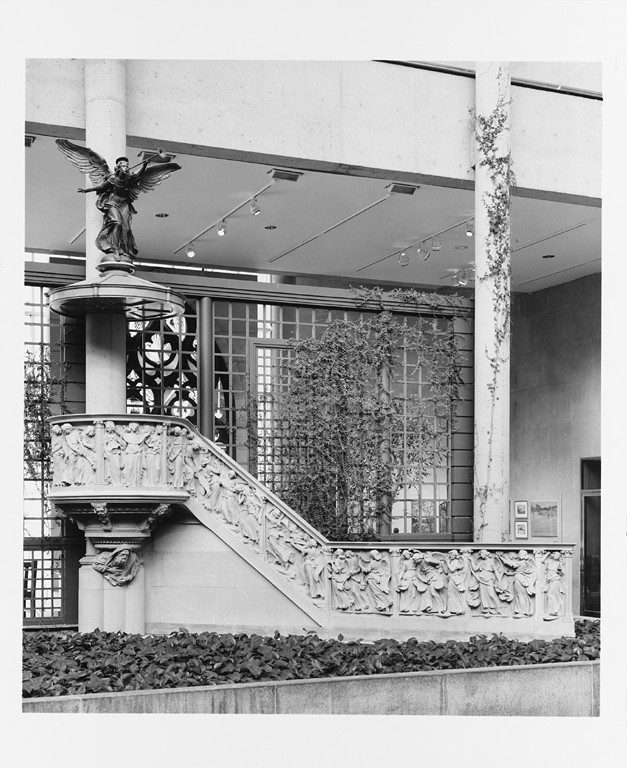
All Angels' pulpit and stair, Metropolitan Museum of Art

Among its treasures was a two-and-a- half-story Tiffany window and a pulpit ringed with limestone angels that wrapped around the banister and paraded toward the top. There, a carved wooden angel leaned out and blew his trumpet into the center of the sanctuary. The pulpit is conserved in the American Wing of the Metropolitan Museum of Art.
There was a wonderful effect in the afternoon, when the setting sun, the afternoon sun, would hit the Tiffany window, which was on the northwest corner, and so it bathed the whole back end of the church in this very golden light, because there’s a lot of gold and gray-blue in that window. Of course you had oak pews, and you had the red carpeting, so all of that was made more golden out of the light.

The main church building was used until 1979, when it was demolished and replaced by a large apartment building. The congregation moved its worship to the parish house, at 251 West 80th Street and have been held there ever since. Some scenes from Hannah and her sisters were filmed in the Whiting Room of the current building. Palmer Hall, which doubles as the church's homeless shelter, won a citation from the AIA.

== Ministry ==
The church holds morning and evening worship services every Sunday, with Holy Eucharist. The evening service invites homeless individuals from the community to join in worship. Following the service, the community shares in a meal together as a continuation of their Eucharist celebration. The church also holds a Sunday evening shelter, staffed by volunteers from the congregation. In addition to the community meal every Sunday, There is also a weekly program called Pathways, which provides showers, clothing, as well as social, medical, and psychiatric services for individuals who need them.

Besides large gatherings, All Angels' has a number of "house churches," located all throughout Manhattan, as well as individual ones in Jersey City, Bergen County, Queens, and Brooklyn, which foster community growth through sharing meals, studying Scripture, and group prayer. In many respects, these small group gatherings mirror the experiences of early Christian worship.

The ministry of the church also has children and youth programs. The Children's Ministry includes Sunday School, a separate worship service, as well as events throughout the year such as "Footsteps to the Cross" (a dramatic re-enactment of the events of Holy Week), and the Christmas Pageant. The Youth Ministry consists of a youth group for children in grades 6 through 12 to grow in fellowship with each other, other church members, and also with the community and wider world through social justice and outreach projects.

=== Staff ===
All Angels' Church experienced a renewal in the 1980s. The congregation has outreach activities to the local poor.

=== Vision ===
The vision of All Angels' is to see people transformed by the gospel,
formed into the image of Christ,
and empowered for missional living.
