= William Hamilton (abolitionist) =

African-American civil rights activist (1773–1836)

William Hamilton (1773 – December 9, 1836) was a prominent African-American orator and civil rights activist, based in New York City. He was born to a free black woman and was reputed to be a natural son of Alexander Hamilton, the Founding Father. William Hamilton is best known as a leader in the first wave of American abolitionism.

== Life and career ==
Hamilton was born in New York sometime in 1773, and was reputed to be a son of Alexander Hamilton, Founding Father and future Secretary of the Treasury. His mother was a free woman of color. Historians are uncertain whether Alexander Hamilton was the father.

William Hamilton learned the trade of carpentry, which he depended on to make his living. He got involved in community activism within the African-American community. Although New York passed a law to establish gradual abolition, there were still numerous slaves being held in the early post-Revolutionary War decades.

In 1808, Hamilton co-founded the New York African Society for Mutual Relief, which provided financial support for sick members as well as for their widows and children.

As part of a movement of African Americans to independence after slavery was abolished, many established independent congregations of churches and other independent black institutions. The African Methodist Episcopal Church (AME Church) was founded in Philadelphia as the first independent black denomination in the new United States. In 1820, Hamilton became a founding member of the African Methodist Episcopal Zion Church, another independent black denomination, in New York City.

In 1827, Hamilton helped establish Freedom's Journal, the first black newspaper in the United States. In the 1830s, he participated in and spoke against slavery at the first national conventions of African Americans. He also worked with William Lloyd Garrison, a prominent white journalist and abolitionist, on his anti-slavery newspaper, The Liberator.

Hamilton married and had a family. His two sons, Robert and Thomas Hamilton, established and edited other African-American newspapers: The People's Press, the Weekly Anglo-African, and the Anglo-African Magazine. The Weekly Anglo-African and Anglo-African Magazine became two of the most influential African American publications in the pre-Civil War period. In 1859, the magazine published Martin Delany's anti-slavery novel Blake. Harriet Beecher Stowe's novel, Uncle Tom's Cabin (1855), had been published a few years before. Both helped raise support for the abolitionist cause.

== Political thought ==
Hamilton strongly opposed slavery, the Atlantic slave trade, and racial prejudice in the United States, delivering numerous speeches in defense of the rights of enslaved people, and African Americans more broadly. Hamilton was also an early champion of Pan-Africanism, arguing for the inter-connectedness and shared heritage of African peoples, regardless of their nationality or geographic location.

Hamilton opposed the scientific racism of the 18th and 19th centuries, which claimed Africans and African Americans were mentally inferior to whites; he believed education and self-improvement would disprove white Americans' belief "that Africans do not possess minds as ingenious as other men." In an 1809 speech to the New York Society for Mutual Relief, he cited poet Phyllis Wheatley as an example of African-American talent. This was in contrast to U.S. President Thomas Jefferson, who had denigrated Wheatley in his Notes on the State of Virginia.

Hamilton was among many black leaders who opposed the goals of the American Colonization Society, a movement among some white Americans to "repatriate" free blacks and newly freed slaves to a West African colony that would become Liberia. Like many blacks in the United States, Hamilton sought full equality and civil rights in the United States, where he was born and had a stake, rather than emigration to Africa, a place he never knew.
