= Maritcha Remond Lyons =

American educator, civic leader, writer (1848–1929)

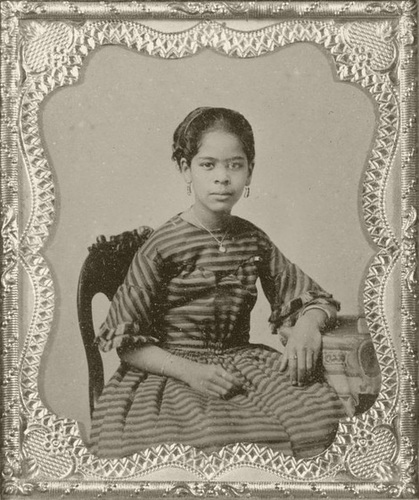
- Maritcha Remond Lyons, around 12 years old
- Born: June 23, 1848; New York City, New York, United States
- Died: January 28, 1929 (aged 80); Brooklyn, New York, United States
- Occupations: American educator Civic leader Writer
- Years active: 1892–1929

Maritcha Remond Lyons (May 23, 1848 – January 28, 1929) was an American educator, civic leader, suffragist, and public speaker in New York City and Brooklyn, New York. She taught in public schools in Brooklyn for 48 years, and was the second black woman to serve in their system as an assistant principal. In 1892, Lyons cofounded the Women's Loyal Union of New York and Brooklyn, one of the first women's rights and racial justice organizations in the United States. One of the accomplishments of the Women's Loyal Union was to help to fund the printing of an important antilynching pamphlet, Southern Horrors: Lynch Laws in All Its Phases by Ida B. Wells.

== Early life ==
Lyons was born at 144 Centre Street in New York City, the third of five children of Albro Lyons Sr. and Mary Joseph Lyons (née Marshall). Her father was a graduate of the first African Free School in Manhattan, New York. The Lyons family lived in New York City's free black community and were active members of the Free African Church of St. Philip in Five Points. Lyons' parents operated a seamen's home and seamen's outfitting store that served also as a cover for the family's Underground Railroad activities. Though she was very ill as a child, Maritcha was eager to acquire an education. She wrote of herself that she developed a "love of study for study’s sake." Lyons attended Manhattan's Colored School No. 6, under the direction of Charles Reason, a former educator at Philadelphia's Institute for Colored Youth.

The Lyons' home on Vandewater Street was attacked several times during the New York City Draft Riots of July 1863. Lyons was a teenager at the time. She fled with her family to Salem, Massachusetts, for a short time before returning to Brooklyn. Because of the ongoing danger, her parents sent the children to Providence, Rhode Island.

In 1865, Lyons was refused entry to the high school in Providence because she was African-American. The state had no high school for black children. The family successfully sued the state of Rhode Island in a campaign to bring an end to segregated schools. At the age of 16, she testified before the state legislature, "plead[ing] for the opening of the door of opportunity". Lyons later became the first African-American student to graduate from Providence High School.

== Career ==
=== Teaching ===
After graduating from high school, Lyons returned to New York to accept a teaching position at Brooklyn's Colored School No. 1, the first African Free School in the Fort Greene neighborhood of Brooklyn. Colored School No. 1 was Brooklyn's first school for African Americans, opened at the current site of the Walt Whitman Houses, one of the largest housing projects in New York City. Lyons' teaching career spanned nearly 50 years. She devoted herself to elementary education and by the end of her career she was the assistant principal of Public School No. 83, the first fully integrated school in Brooklyn.

Lyons was a well-known lecturer and speaker. She once won a debate against Ida B. Wells at the Brooklyn Literary Union and Wells credits Lyons with teaching her how to become a better public speaker.

=== Activism ===
On October 5, 1892, Lyons and educator and activist Victoria Earle Matthews organized a testimonial dinner in New York’s Lyric Hall for Ida B. Wells and her anti-lynching campaign. They continued to work on this issue, founding the Women’s Loyal Union of New York and Brooklyn in February 1892.

Lyons fought for voting rights for women as a member of the Colored Women's Equal Suffrage League of Brooklyn.

=== Memoir, writing and book ===
Lyons' memoir and photographs of herself and her family are included in the Harry A. Williamson Papers at the Schomburg Center for Research in Black Culture of the New York Public Library. Her memoir was never published, but includes a breathtaking account of the sacking and burning of her family's home by a mob during the New York City Draft Riots of 1863. These riots were so destructive of black neighborhoods in Manhattan that many African Americans left the city permanently, some moving to Brooklyn for safety. It also describes how Lyons wrote about her family's involvement in assisting escaping slaves as part of the Underground Railroad in her memoir, Memories of Yesterdays: All of Which I Saw and Part of Which I Was (1928).

A young adult book was written about Lyons, Maritcha: A Remarkable Nineteenth-Century Girl, based on her memoir and writing.

In addition to her memoir, Lyons contributed eight biographical sketches to Hallie Quinn Brown's Homespun Heroines and Other Women of Distinction (1926), which include sketches of Sarah H. Fayerweather (1802–1868) and Agnes J. Adams (1885–1923).

== Personal life ==
Lyons lived in Brooklyn, with her brother and his family, until she died.

== Family tree ==
Some of the family members include:
Please note capitalization of surnames is typically used in genealogy trees

- George LYONS Sr.
  - Albro LYONS Sr. Married to Mary Joseph MARSHALL.
    - Maritcha Remond LYONS. Born: May 23, 1848, New York, NY. Died: January 28, 1929, Brooklyn, NY.
    - Albro LYONS Jr.
    - Mary Elizabeth "Pauline" LYONS. Married to William Edward WILLIAMSON.
      - Henry "Harry" Albro WILLIAMSON. Born: October 25, 1875, in Plainfield, NJ. Married: 1901. Married to Laura Julia MOULTON. Divorced. Married: 1920. Married to Blanche C. ATKINS (Died: 1960). Died: January 3, 1965.

== Other ==
- Lyons Community School in the Bedford–Stuyvesant neighborhood of Brooklyn, New York was named after Lyons. Maritcha R. Lyons Park, in the DUMBO neighborhood, was also named after her.

== Works or publications ==
- Bolden, Tonya. Maritcha: A Remarkable Nineteenth-Century Girl. New York: Harry N. Abrams, 2004. ISBN 978-0-810-95045-0 OCLC 163592738
- Williamson, Harry A. Henry Albro Williamson Collection. New York: New York Public Library, Schomburg Center for Research in Black Culture, 1970. OCLC 437118355
  - Henry Albro Williamson Collection Finding Aid (PDF)
  - Includes Lyons' unpublished memoir: Memories of Yesterdays: All of Which I Saw and Part of Which I Was (1928)
- Lyons, Maritcha R. "Sarah H. Fayerweather", "Agnes J. Adams", and 6 others. Brown, Hallie Q. Homespun Heroines and Other Women of Distinction. Chapel Hill, N.C.: Academic Affairs Library, University of North Carolina at Chapel Hill, 2000. ISBN 978-0-195-05237-4 OCLC 45351693

== See also ==
- New York City Draft Riots
- First National Conference of the Colored Women of America
