= Reynolds Arcade =

Historic commercial building in New York, United States

- U.S. National Register of Historic Places
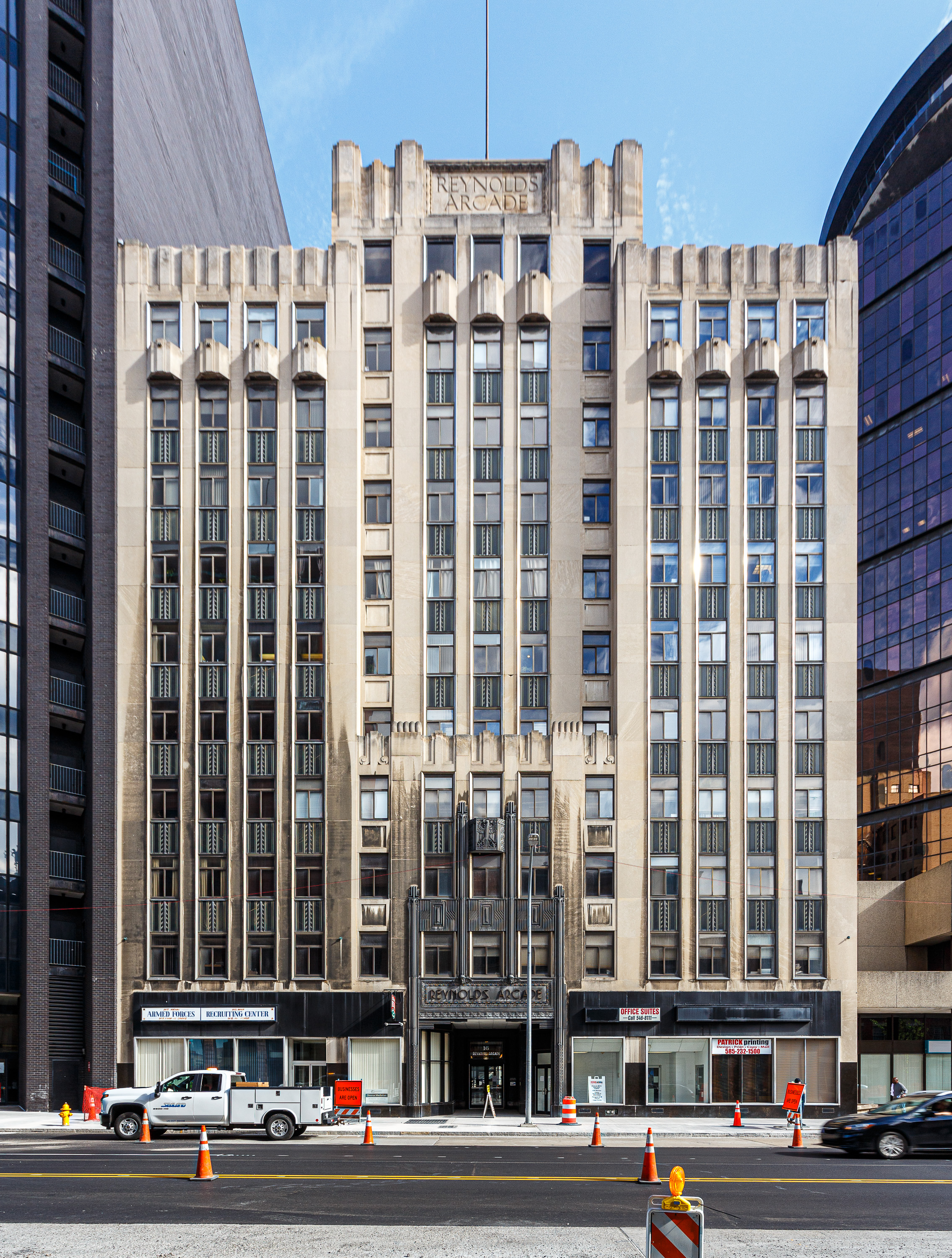

- Location within New York Location within the United States
- Location: 16 E. Main St., Rochester, New York
- Coordinates: 43°9′21″N 77°36′44″W
- Area: less than one acre
- Built: 1933
- Architect: Gordon & Kaelber
- Architectural style: Art Deco
- MPS: Inner Loop MRA
- NRHP reference No.: 85002855
- Added to NRHP: October 4, 1985

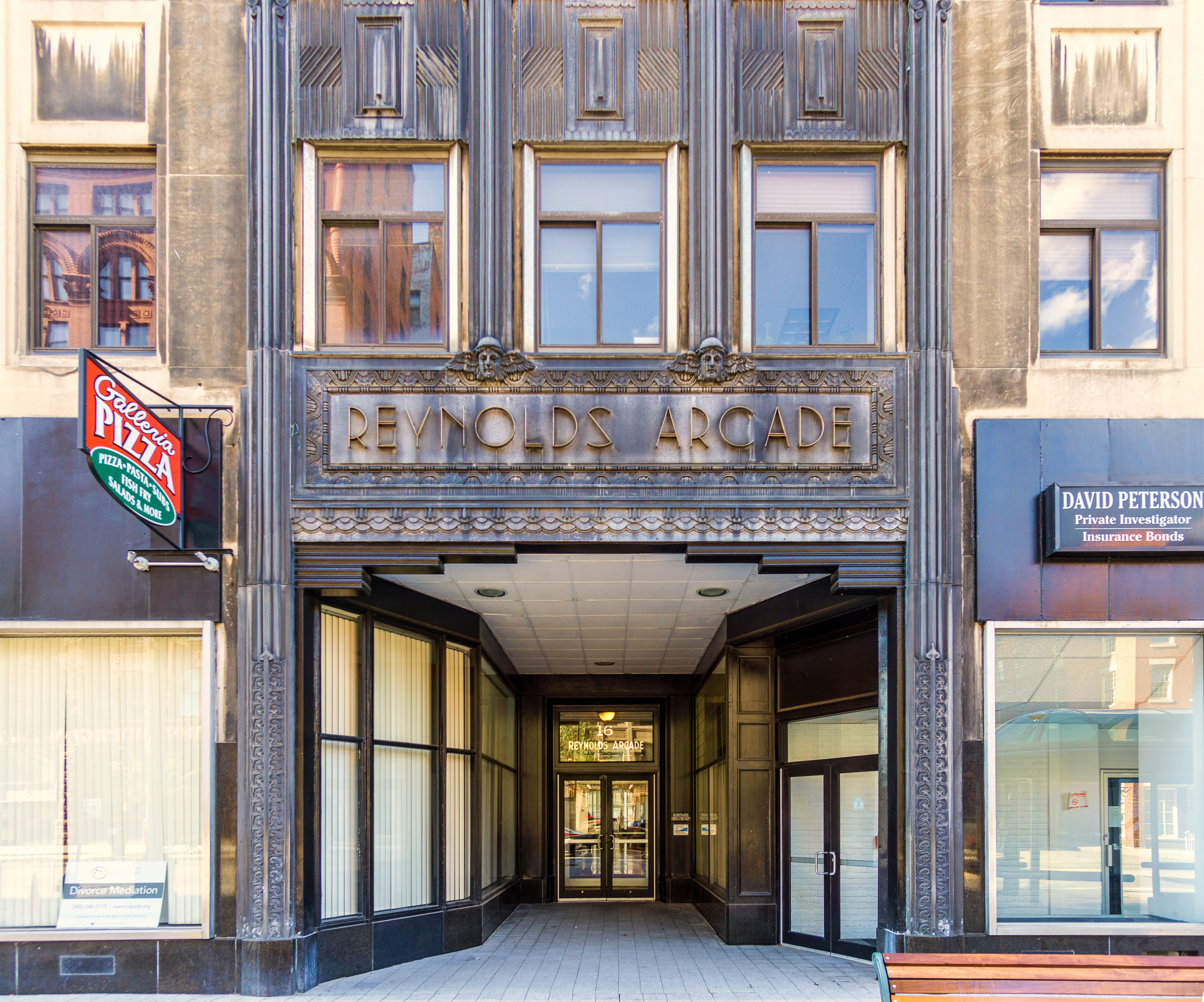
Entrance detail

Reynolds Arcade is an office building located in Rochester in Monroe County, New York.

== Overview ==
It is an eleven-story, Art Deco style commercial / office building with arcaded shops on the first floor. It was built in 1933 of steel frame construction and is faced on the exterior with Indiana limestone. The central portion of the building is a five bay, eleven story "tower" which steps back from the fifth floor.

It replaced a building with the same name that was constructed in 1829. The most ambitious structure in Rochester at that time, it was, according to Joseph W. Barnes, a Rochester City Historian, "the center of Rochester downtown life for more than a century."

== Recognition ==
It was listed on the National Register of Historic Places in 1985.
