= New York African Society for Mutual Relief =

The African Society for Mutual Relief was a mutual aid organization established in New York City in 1808. Its building was attacked in the 1834 anti-abolition riots.

Leaders of the group included William Hamilton, its first president; Cato Alexander, an inn keeper; Philip Bell, editor and publisher of The Colored American; and Abraham Lawrence, president of the Harlem Railroad.
