= Wedding of Theodore Weld and Angelina Grimké =

Symbolic day in American abolitionism

A symbolic day in the history of the American abolitionist movement was May 14, 1838. On that date two related events occurred: the inauguration in Philadelphia of Pennsylvania Hall, built to symbolize and facilitate the abolitionist movement, and the wedding of Theodore Weld and Angelina Grimké, "the wedding that ignited Philadelphia." The wedding was held that day because of the many out-of-town abolitionists present for the inauguration of the Hall.

Theodore Dwight Weld and Angelina Emily Grimké, both devoted to the abolition movement, wed that evening at the house of Anna R. Frost, the bride's widowed sister. The wedding was carefully planned, and "designed to demonstrate, challenge and irritate". Grimké "was getting married in a manner calculated to shock and dismay the pillars of Charleston society, among whom she had been raised". Both bride and groom were famous, and not just in abolitionist circles. Abolitionists from around the country were in attendance. The wedding date and location were selected to maximize publicity for the abolitionist cause. It was designed to illustrate Black and white cooperation, Black skill, and to lead by example.

Their marriage ceremony is unique in American history; there had never been one like it before. No minister married them; they married themselves. Not only did they create their own vows, which at the time was unheard of, they did so extemporaneously. "Neither Theodore nor Angelina felt as if they could bind themselves to any preconceived form of words, and accordingly uttered such as the Lord gave them at the moment." It is the first marriage in American history in which a man and a woman married as equals, promising affection but not obedience. Both Black and white friends and clergy were present. To make a notary also unnecessary under Pennsylvania law, the signatures of those present witnessed the marriage. The wedding cake used "free" sugar (not produced by enslaved workers).

== Two national abolitionist leaders ==
=== Angelina Emily Grimké ===
In 1838, Angelina Grimké was known as the "most notorious" woman in the country. She was known as a lecturer, telling of the horrors of slavery she had witnessed first-hand as a member of a distinguished and well-to-do slave-owning family of South Carolina.

It was accepted for women to speak to female groups; some sewing circles invited visitors to this effect, but Angelina was the first woman in the United States to appear as a lecturer. Before large mixed audiences of men and women, which provoked much commentary. When she addressed the Massachusetts Legislature in 1836, it was the first time a woman had addressed any legislative body in the United States.

=== Theodore Weld ===
Weld avoided the limelight and didn't hold any office or lead any organization. However, many historians regard Weld as the most important figure in the abolitionist movement, surpassing even Garrison.

Weld and Grimké met in an Ohio training class for abolitionist speakers and activists, which Weld taught. Angelina Grimké and her sister Sarah were the only female participants.

=== The Grimké–Weld courtship ===
Weld became aware of Grimké in 1835, when she wrote to William Lloyd Garrison talking about the abolitionist cause. Garrison, somewhat to her surprise, published it, along with great praise. Weld read The Liberator, as all American abolitionist leaders did.

Weld and Grimké became more than acquaintances when Weld ran a three-week summer training camp in Ohio for abolitionist organizers. Under the auspices of the American Anti-Slavery Society, 70 agents were trained. The Grimké sisters were the only female students.

Both Angelina and Theodore travelled throughout the Northeast in the 1830s, speaking about the slavery and organizing local abolition societies. As a result, their courtship is well documented, as it took place primarily through letters. Fortunately, they have been preserved and published, and there are articles devoted to their relationship.

In the context of nineteenth-century women's rights, Weld and Grimké were set to determine for themselves what marriage between a man and a woman should be. The two "lacked contemporary examples of egalitarian marriages to emulate".

== The wedding ==
=== The inauguration of Pennsylvania Hall ===
The date of the wedding, May 14, was chosen to coincide with the inauguration of a new abolitionist venue, Pennsylvania Hall, which opened the same day. Pennsylvania Hall was a building in downtown Philadelphia, where (Quaker) abolitionism in the United States had started. Taking place in the building were the first Anti-Slavery Convention of American Women; the annual meeting of the Pennsylvania Anti-Slavery Society, which had built the building; and an initial meeting to found a National Requited Labor Association, which promoted purchase of goods produced by paid workers. The first free produce store in the country was opened in one of the four storefronts on the ground floor of Pennsylvania Hall. Another held the editorial office of John Greenleaf Whittier's newspaper, the Pennsylvania Freeman, another an abolitionist reading room, and the fourth the Pennsylvania Anti-Slavery Society's office. The well-lit main hall held 3,000.

On Monday, a day of meetings, speeches, and reports concluded with "what was, among abolitionists at least, the wedding of the century," "an abolition wedding."

=== The invitations ===
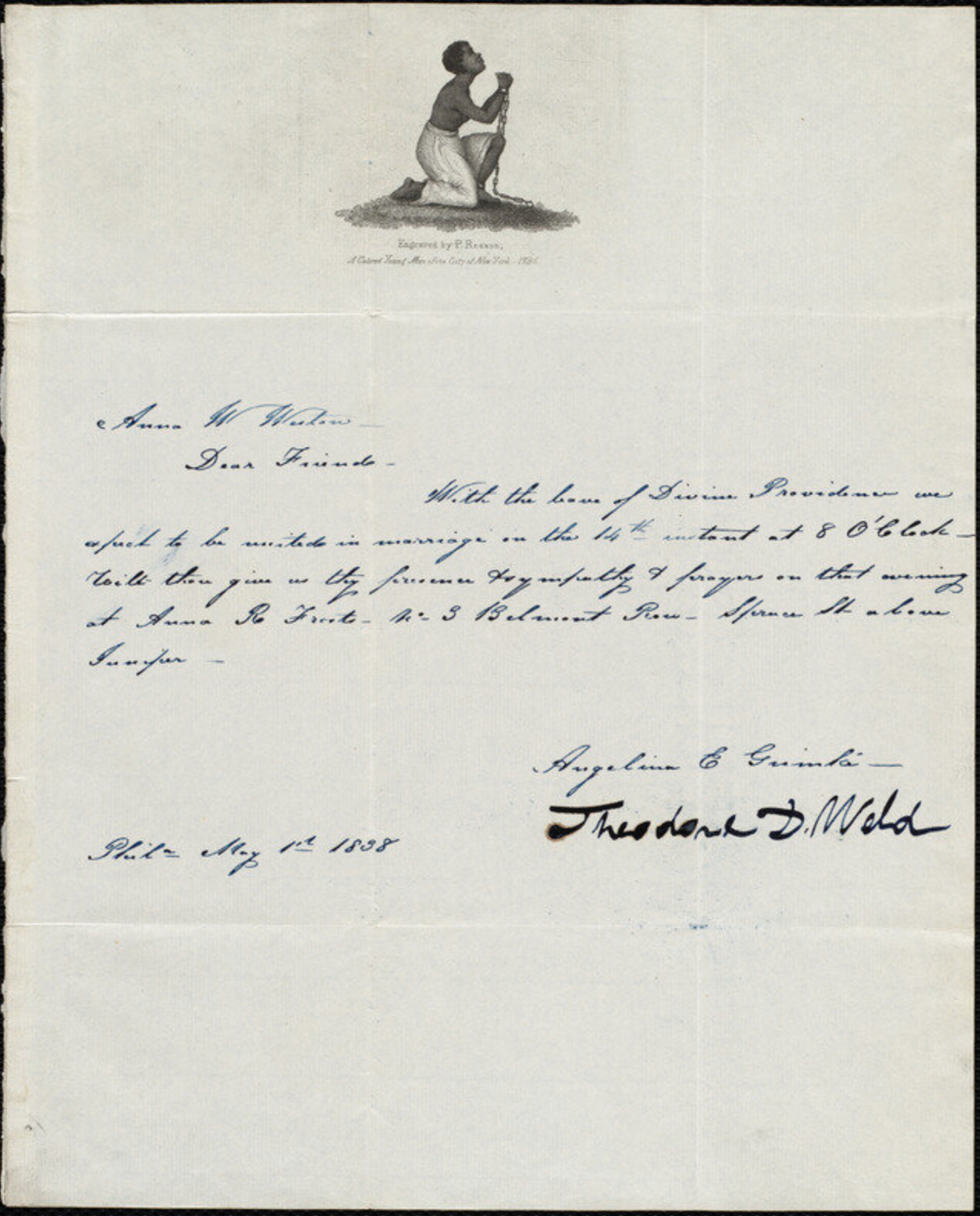
Weld-Grimké wedding invitation

Over 80 handwritten invitations were sent, to friends and acquaintances in many states. At the top, uniquely, was the abolitionist icon, the image of a kneeling slave in chains.

According to a hostile newspaper, Weld and Grimké "took care to have a number of colored persons among the bridesmaids and groomsmen."

=== Guests at the wedding ===
Given the meetings, many abolitionists from around the country were in attendance. Many were guests at the wedding.

§ indicates an African American

- James G. Birney (Huntsville, Alabama), leading Southern abolitionist, presidential candidate of the Liberty Party in the 1840 and 1844 presidential elections.
- Charles C. Burleigh (Northampton, Massachusetts), an abolitionist speaker, editor of The Unionist and The Pennsylvania Freeman. He refused to shave his beard as long as slavery lasted.
- Celia M. Burleigh (Cazenovia, New York), at the time a girl of 11.
- Maria Weston Chapman (Boston), abolitionist activist, fundrsiser, and writer; previously a teacher.
- § Betsy Dawson and her daughter, former slaves of the Grimké family
- § Sarah Mapps Douglass (Philadelphia), a Black woman and a Quaker, head of a school for African-American girls. She was a lifelong friend of Sarah Grimké, and the two had worked together in the Philadelphia Anti-Slavery Society.
- § Grace Bustill Douglass (Philadelphia), an African-American abolitionist and women's rights advocate.
- Amos Dresser, Oberlin student, part of Weld's Oneida Institute walkout of 1832, then, in 1834, the Lane Student walkout, also led by Weld. He was famous in abolitionist circles for having been publicly whipped in Nashville, Tennessee, for possessing abolitionist literature. "I have just heard of Dresser's being flogged; it is no surprise at all", Angelina wrote in the letter mentioned above, which was Weld's first contact with her.
  - Other Lane rebels attending were Hiram Wilson, George Avery, and Henry Stanton.
- William Lloyd Garrison (Boston), publisher of abolitionist books and pamphlets; editor-publisher of The Liberator, the leading anti-slavery newspaper in the United States.
- Sarah Grimké, the bride's sister. The only other members of the Grimké family to attend were two former house slaves of their father: Betsy Dawson and her daughter. Stephen (Grimké), another former slave of their father, may also have been present. see Sarah's remarks on the Black relatives present.
- Abby Kelley (Lynn, Massachusetts), teacher, about to speak at the first Anti-Slavery Convention of American Women. Described as more radical than Angelina.
- Samuel Philbrick (Brookline, Massachusetts). Philbrick's house, originally built by the Tappans, was an Underground Railroad stop. The Grimké sisters spoke in his house in 1837, the first recorded anti-slavery meeting in Brookline.
- Gerrit Smith and his wife Anne (Peterboro, New York). Smith was the leading abolitionist philanthropist, later one of John Brown's Secret Six.
- Jane Smith (abolitionist) (Philadelphia), a friend of Angelina.
- Henry Brewster Stanton (Seneca Falls, New York), member of Weld's student walk-out group, leading abolitionist speaker, soon to marry Elizabeth Cady. For their honeymoon, they went to London to attend the World Anti-Slavery Convention. They named one of their sons Theodore Weld Stanton.
- Charles Stuart (Utica, New York), first president of the New York Anti-Slavery Society, close friend of Weld
- Arthur Tappan
- Lewis Tappan (New York), businessman and philanthropist, whose donations were central to the founding of Oberlin College, in its early years the most anti-slavery college in the country. Tappan's funds were also central to the defense of the Africans in the Amistad incident.
- James A. Thome (Kentucky), agent of the American Anti-Slavery Society, speaker at its 1834 meeting, wrote apologizing for not attending.
- Lewis Weld, Theodore Weld's older brother, "the president of the asylum for deaf mutes."
- Anne Warren Weston (Boston)
- John Greenleaf Whittier (Philadelphia), abolitionist newspaper editor and poet. He waited outside during the ceremony since, as a practicing Quaker, he could not be present when a Quaker (Grimké) married a non-Quaker (Weld). His newspaper's new office in Pennsylvania Hall was destroyed in the fire, but not its press.
- Henry C. Wright (Newburyport, Massachusetts), called a "blazing advocate" for the abolition of slavery, writer and speaker.
- § Theodore S. Wright (New York City), a Black minister, who said a blessing. He had been a founding member and was on the executive committee of the American Anti-Slavery Society.

=== The ceremony itself ===
Angelina "could not conscientiously consent to be married by a clergyman". Theodore was more than happy to go along with her wishes.

They investigated and found that under Pennsylvania law, marriage is a civil contract and those entering into the contract could do so in whatever way they chose; the only requirement was the presence of a notary public, so that there would be a legal record. However, again under Pennsylvania law, twelve witnesses fulfilled the function of the notary public. Given this, they decided to marry in front of their friends, without "a stranger" present.

Theirs is the first American wedding in which the couple themselves declared themselves married: the marriage was "not by minister or magistrate, but by standing up in the midst of their invited guests, and taking each other for husband and wife", which a reporting newspaper called a "unpardonable offence". In addition, it is the first in which the couple created their own vows. However, they did so extemporaneously. According to the bride's sister Sarah:

Neither Theodore nor Angelina felt as if they could bind themselves to any preconceived form of words, and accordingly uttered such as the Lord gave them at the moment. Theodore addressed Angelina in a solemn and tender manner. He alluded to the unrighteous power vested in a husband by the laws of the United States over the person and property of his wife, and he abjured all authority, all government, save the influence which love would give to them over each other as moral and immortal beings. ...Angelina's address to him was brief but comprehensive, containing a promise to honor him, to prefer him above herself, to love him with a pure heart fervently.

Newspaper coverage was contemptuous, calling Weld a "he-male" and Grimké a "she-male". However, they reported that: "Alvan Stewart, Esq.[,] read the civil law, and another individual the divine law, to the parties; after which, Mr. W. addressed the audience in the following words, viz.:

I here promise before God, his angels, and this assembly, to take Miss Angelina Emily Grimke for my wife, as an equal, and I waive all claims to that obedience which is usually claimed in the marriage ceremony.

Miss Angelina repeated nearly the same, and thus the pair became man and wife." According to the bride's sister Sarah, Weld "abjured all authority, all government, save the influence which love would give to them over each other." In another report, "Weld denounced traditional marriage vows and Grimké refused to include the word 'obey'". Referring to the legal principle of femme couverte, Weld renounced any power or legal authority over his wife, and Grimké vowed to love and honor, not obey him.

The marriage certificate was read aloud by David Garrison, and, replacing the need for a notary under Pennsylvania law, it was then signed by "the company".

=== The wedding cake ===
The free produce movement, whose goal was making available products (not just produce in the modern sense) not produced by slave labor, was to have its organizational meeting in Pennsylvania Hall. One of the four small stores along the side of the building was for sale of these products.

The wedding cake was baked by a Black baker, using free produce sugar.

Angelina's trousseau was exclusively of "free" cotton.

== After the wedding ==
=== The spectre of amalgamation ===
That a marriage had taken place and that both Blacks and whites were present was soon generally known. Lacking detailed information, the rumor began that this was an “amalgamation wedding”, that is, a white person and a Black person were marrying. This outraged the crowd and helped fuel the anger that erupted at Pennsylvania Hall. According to a newspaper, reporting the arson: "Mrs. Angelina Grimke Weld, it appears, was one of the agitators. ...This is rather a queer honey moon for Angelina and Theodore, wedded on Monday, bedded on Tuesday, and setting Philadelphia on fire on Wednesday." Arthur Tappan, in a letter to the editor, called this "an atrocious lie".

=== Destruction of Pennsylvania Hall ===
The Weld-Grimké wedding was timed to coincide with the opening on Monday, May 14, 1838, of Pennsylvania Hall (Philadelphia). Built by the Pennsylvania Anti-Slavery Society, it was the first and only building erected anywhere as a meeting place for abolitionists and affiliated movements. Blacks and women were just as welcome as white men, both as attendees and as speakers, and they sat together, which was very unusual and the subject of comment.

Angelina was the final speaker in Pennsylvania Hall, on Wednesday night, refusing to let stones breaking the windows stop her. It was also the last speech Angelina would give for many years. After she was finished, the white attendees exited arm-in-arm with the Blacks, for the latter's protection.

The next day, in the biggest case of arson since the British burned the Capitol and the White House during the War of 1812, the hall was burned to the ground by a pro-slavery mob. Firemen were forcibly prevented from saving the building.

In the newspapers, coverage of the riot and arson somewhat overshadowed reporting on the marriage. One newspaper report said that outrage over the wedding contributed to the tensions that led to the hall's destruction.

The outrage was that Blacks and whites sat together "promiscuously", walked in the street together, and a newspaper remarked on recommendations that whites not support segregated seating. "The publication of these resolutions and the practical carrying of them out in the street, and in the hall, produced a tremendous excitement, which was manifested slightly on Monday evening, and grew more and more strong, till the catastrophe on Thursday night."

=== Quaker excommunication of Angelina and Sarah ===
Angelina and Sarah were promptly excommunicated by the Quakers, as they knew they would be: Angelina for marrying a non-Quaker, and Sarah for being present.

=== Angelina, Theodore, and Sarah ===
After the wedding, Theodore, Angelina, and Sarah, who had agreed to live together for the rest of their lives, spent several weeks at the house of Weld's parents, in Manlius, New York. Neither Angelina nor Sarah had ever cooked a meal, and they knew nothing about housekeeping; Weld's mother instructed them.

They set up housekeeping in Fort Lee, New Jersey. Theodore commuted to New York for his work as director of publications for the American Anti-Slavery Society. The team of three set to work documenting slavery's abuses, using as a source, advertisements posted by their owners concerning runaway slaves. Theodore purchased thousands of issues of newspapers being discarded at the New York Stock Exchange reading room, took them home, and the two women operated a clipping service, something never done before in the United States, almost 50 years before the first commercial clipping service was created.

The names of all three are on the title page of their highly influential exposé American Slavery As It Is, published the following year (1839). This book, which contained a subject index, directly influenced Harriet Beecher Stowe and was a major source for Uncle Tom's Cabin.

Theodore and Angelina had three children: Charles Stuart Weld (1839–1901), Theodore Grimké Weld (1841–1917), and Sarah Grimké Weld (1844–1899).

They then moved to Washington, D.C., where Weld was involved in a forgotten but major issue at the time, ending slavery in the District of Columbia (see gag rule). For economic security they then became educators, running boarding schools in New Jersey including the Eagleswood School at Raritan Bay Union.
