= Pennsylvania Hall (Philadelphia) =

Venue in Philadelphia, Pennsylvania, U.S. used by abolitionists

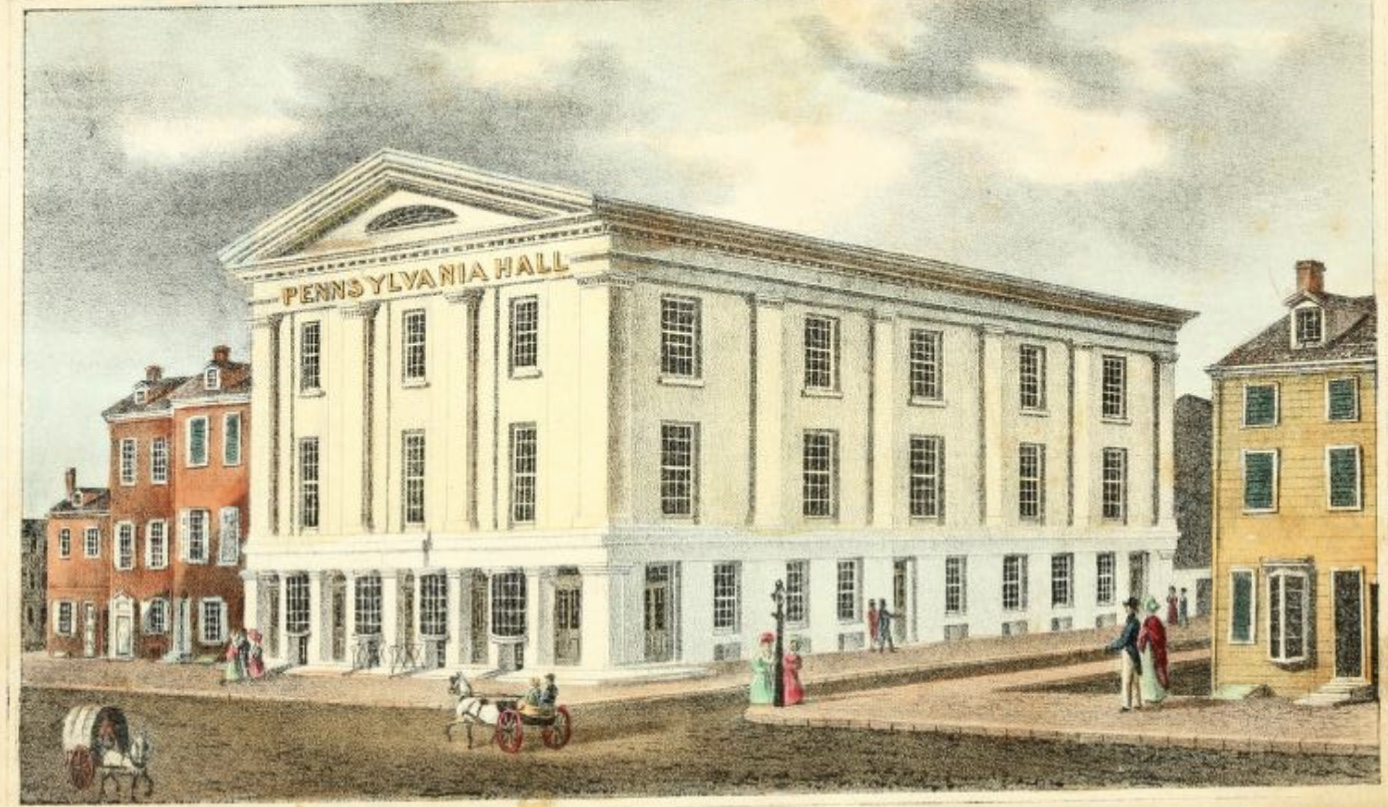
- An illustration of Pennsylvania Hall at its opening in 1838

General information
- Status: Destroyed by arson
- Location: 109 N. 6th Street, Philadelphia, Pennsylvania, United States
- Coordinates: 39.95430°N 75.14979°W
- Inaugurated: May 14, 1838
- Closed: May 17, 1838
- Cost: $40,000 (equivalent to $1,209,375 in 2025)
- Owner: Pennsylvania Anti-Slavery Society

Height
- Height: 42 feet (13 m)

Dimensions
- Other dimensions: 62 × 100 feet (19 × 30 m)

Technical details
- Floor count: 3 + basement

Design and construction
- Architect: Thomas Somerville Stewart

Pennsylvania Hall, "one of the most commodious and splendid buildings in the city," was an abolitionist venue in Philadelphia, built in 1837–1838. It was a "Temple of Free Discussion," where antislavery, women's rights, and other reform lecturers could be heard. Four days after it opened it was destroyed by arson, the work of an anti-abolitionist mob.

This was only six months after the murder of Rev. Elijah P. Lovejoy by a pro-slavery mob in Illinois, a free state. The abolitionist movement consequently became stronger. The process repeated itself with Pennsylvania Hall; the movement gained strength because of the outrage the burning caused. Abolitionists realized that in some places they would be met with violence. The country became more polarized.

== Building name and purpose ==
Located at 109 N. 6th Street in Philadelphia, the site was "symbolically and strategically ideal." It was near where the United States was born, where the Declaration of Independence and the Constitution were created. It was also in the middle of the Philadelphia Quaker community, so active in the beginnings of the abolition of slavery and in aiding fugitives.

Considering the organization that built it, the offices and stores located there, and the meetings held during the four days of its use, the new building was clearly intended to have an abolitionist focus. But to name it "Abolition Hall" would have been reckless and provocative. "Pennsylvania Hall" was a neutral alternative. "The Board of Managers took pains to make clear that the hall was not exclusively for the use of abolitionists. It was to be open on an equal basis for rental by any groups 'for any purpose not of an immoral character'."

== Construction ==
The Hall was built by the Pennsylvania Anti-Slavery Society "because abolitionists had such a difficult time finding space for their meetings." The building was designed by architect Thomas Somerville Stewart; it was his first major building.

To finance construction a joint-stock company was created. Two thousand people bought $20 shares, raising over $40,000. Others donated material and labor.

In January 1838, Theodore Dwight Weld declined an offer to deliver "an address" upon the building's opening.

== Description of the building ==
On the ground floor were four stores or offices, which fronted on Sixth St. One was an abolitionist reading room and bookstore; another held the office of the Pennsylvania Freeman, John Greenleaf Whittier's newly reincarnated abolitionist newspaper. Another held the office of the Pennsylvania Anti-Slavery Society, the building's manager, and the fourth was devoted to the sale of products grown or produced without slave labor (free produce).

The first floor also contained "a neat lecture room" seating between 200 and 300 persons, fronting on Haines Street. There were two committee rooms and three large entries and stairways 7 feet (2.1 m) wide leading to the second floor.

On the second floor there was a large auditorium, with three galleries, on the third floor, surrounding it, "seating all told perhaps as many as three thousand persons. The building was ventilated through the roof, so fresh air could be obtained without opening the windows. It was lighted with gas. The interior appointments were luxurious." Above the stage was a banner with Pennsylvania's motto, "Virtue, Liberty, and Independence."

In the basement, because of the weight of the press and type, was to be the press for the Society's abolitionist newspaper, the National Enquirer and General Register, which had been edited by Benjamin Lundy, but with the move Lundy's successor, John Greenleaf Whittier, took over as editor, and the name changed to Pennsylvania Freeman. However, the press had not yet been moved at the time of the fire, and thus escaped destruction.

== Destruction of the building planned in advance ==
The following is from a letter to the editor signed "J. A. G.," published in a New York newspaper on May 30:

In the first place, it is certain that nothing which occurred in that hall was the cause of its destruction; for, while in Philadelphia, I was credibly informed that intimation that its destruction was resolved upon was given to the managers of the building several weeks previously to its completion; and it was from a knowledge of this fact that [abolitionist] Alvan Stewart, Esq, of Utica, in a speech delivered on Wednesday afternoon, before any disturbance had occurred, publicly stated that there were reasons for believing that Pennsylvania Hall would before many days be in ruins. It was not the mere outbreak of popular indignation, for facts are already known sufficient to prove that there was a complete organization for the destruction of that building, and these facts will in due time be disclosed; and, I may add, that there were too many gentlemen from a certain section of the country, lodging at a certain hotel in Philadelphia, under the pretext of attending the Camden Races, and that these gentlemen were too unguarded in their remarks at the time of the riot.

The Mayor of Philadelphia had advance knowledge of an "organized band" prepared to disrupt the meeting and "perhaps do injury to the building":

[T]he Mayor went to some of the leading members of the society owning this building, and represented to them the great danger of continuing to hold their meetings, and he especially urged upon them the propriety of not assembling that evening, as he had every reason to believe that there was an organized band prepared to break up the meeting, and perhaps do injury to the building and crowded as the walk must be by the company, this could not be done without personal injury and loss of life.

== Timeline ==
Meetings were being held in the building before its formal opening on May 14.

Throughout the ceremonies, blacks and whites sat in the audience without separation, and except for those meetings specifically for women, men and women did as well. Such a heterogenous audience had never existed in Philadelphia before. In addition, women and blacks spoke to mixed audiences, which was for some a delight and for others a threat to social order.

=== Monday, May 14, 1838 ===
- 10 AM: "The President [of the Association] will take the chair at 10 o'clock precisely. The Secretary will then read a short statement of the monies which induced the stockholders to erect the building, and the purposes for which it is to be used. Also several interesting letters from individuals at distance." Letters from philanthropist Gerrit Smith, abolitionist organizer Theodore Weld, who had been invited to address the meeting, and former president John Quincy Adams were read. Ohio Senator Thomas Morris was invited in January to speak at the dedication, but was unable to attend, and also sent a letter to be read.

Adams' letter read, in part:

I learnt with great satisfaction...that the Pennsylvania Hall Association have erected a large building in your city, wherein liberty and equality of civil rights can be freely discussed, and the evils of slavery fearlessly portrayed. ...I rejoice that, in the city of Philadelphia, the friends of free discussion have erected a Hall for its unrestrained exercise.

"After which, David Paul Brown of this city ["counsellor at law"] will deliver an Oration upon Liberty."

- "In the afternoon the Philadelphia Lyceum will meet at 3 o'clock, when an Essay upon the Lyceum system of Instruction, showing its advantages, mode of operation, &c., written by Victor Value, of Philadelphia, will be read. At 3 1/2 o'clock, James P. Espy, of Philad., will explain the cause of winds, clouds, storms, and other atmospheric phenomena. At 4 1/2 o'clock several interesting questions will be read and referred to different members of the Lyceum for solution at their meeting on Tuesday afternoon. This meeting will conclude with a discussion on the question—Which has the greater influence, Wealth or Knowledge?" The debate will be opened by two members of the Lyceum—after which any member or visitor may participate. The meeting will adjourn at 6 o'clock." The Lyceum, "so that it should not appear to be in any way connected with the benevolent institution known by the name of the Anti-Slavery Society," requested that the Pennsylvania Hall Association not publish the proceedings of their Monday and Tuesday afternoon meetings.
- "Evening meeting at 8 o'clock. Lecture upon Temperance, by Thomas P. Hunt, of South Carolina, preceded by a short address from Arnold Buffum, of Philadelphia, on the same subject." "[S]ome person in the vicinity threw a brickbat through the window and blind."
- In the evening, at the house of Ann R. Frost, the bride's sister, there took place "what was, among abolitionists at least, the wedding of the century," "an abolition wedding": Angelina Grimké married Theodore Dwight Weld. (See Wedding of Theodore Weld and Angelina Grimké.) The couple, who had met in an abolition training session, wrote their own marital vows. Present were William Lloyd Garrison, Lewis Tappan, Henry B. Stanton, Henry C. Wright, Maria Weston Chapman, James G. Birney, Abby Kelley, Sarah Mapps Douglass, the bride's sister Sarah Grimké, and two former slaves of the Grimké family, whose freedom Ann had purchased. The cake was made by a Black confectioner, using free-produce sugar. Both a Black and a White minister gave blessings; the Black one was Theodore S. Wright.

=== Tuesday, May 15 ===
- At 10 AM the first Anti-Slavery Convention of American Women held a preliminary meeting in "the session roon"; the Grimké sisters, Lucretia Mott, Maria Weston Chapman, Susan Paul, Sarah Mapps Douglass, Juliana Tappan, eldest daughter of philanthropist and abolition activist Lewis Tappan, and others from as far as Maine were in attendance.
- In the "Grand Saloon," Pennsylvania Representative Walter Forward, who was to have talked on "the right of Free Discussion," and Ohio Senator Thomas Morris did not appear as announced. James Burleigh read, at Whittier's request, a lengthy "poetical address" by John Greenleaf Whittier, who was present. Local abolitionist Lewis C. Gunn spoke at length extemporaneously, followed by Burleigh talking about Indian removal, and Alvin Stewart about the Seminoles. (May 23 was the deadline for the removal of Native Americans on the Trail of Tears from Florida, Georgia, and other Southern states to the future Oklahoma.) In response to audience requests, Garrison, "who had not been invited to speak in Philadelphia since 1835," rose to attack the speech of Brown (for not rejecting "colonization"), followed by Burleigh and Stewart, who criticized both Brown and colonization. "With no end to the debate in sight and the Lyceum members waiting to use the room," Samuel Webb announced that the debate, on abolitionism versus colonization, announced for the following week. would take place the next morning.
- The Lyceum met in the afternoon, considering "the history, present condition, and future prospects of the human mind," and "whether opposition or approbation from others provided greater proof of a man's merit."
- At 4 PM, again in the session room, the Anti-Slavery Convention of American Women set up a committee to prepare an agenda ("business"). The following day, they were to meet in Temperance Hall.
- "We herewith enclose a written piacard, numbers of which were posted up in various parts of the city, and, so far as we have seen, all appeared to be in the same hand writing."
  Whereas a convention for the avowed purpose of effecting the immediate emancipation of slaves throughout the United States, is at this time holding its session in Philadelphia, it behoves the citizens who entertain a proper respect for the right of prop[er]ty [slaves], and the preservation of the constitution of the Union to interfere, forcibly if they must, to prevent the violation of those pledges heretofore held sacred, and it is proposed that they assemble at the Pennsylvania Hall to-morrow morning Wednesday 15th May and demand the immediate dispersion of said convention.

=== Wednesday, May 16 ===
- The annual meeting of the Pennsylvania State Anti-Slavery Society "for the Eastern District" had been announced for 10 AM but it met instead at 8 AM, to allow a debate on abolition versus colonization to take place. They adjourned until 2 PM.
- In the Grand Saloon, a large crowd gathered to hear the debate on colonization versus abolitionism. No one showed up to make the case for colonization, so those for abolition proceeded to discuss "Slavery and its Remedy."
- About 50 to 60 people gathered outside, making occasional threats against the attendees. The group grew throughout the day, using increasingly abusive language. The building managers hired two watchmen to keep the peace.
- That evening, William Lloyd Garrison introduced Maria Weston Chapman to an audience of 3,000 abolitionists. The mob outside grew violent, smashing windows and breaking into the meeting. Despite the turmoil, Angelina Grimké Weld convinced the audience to stay with an hour-long speech. To protect their more vulnerable members, the group of whites and blacks left the gathering, whites and blacks arm-in-arm, through a hail of rocks and jeers.

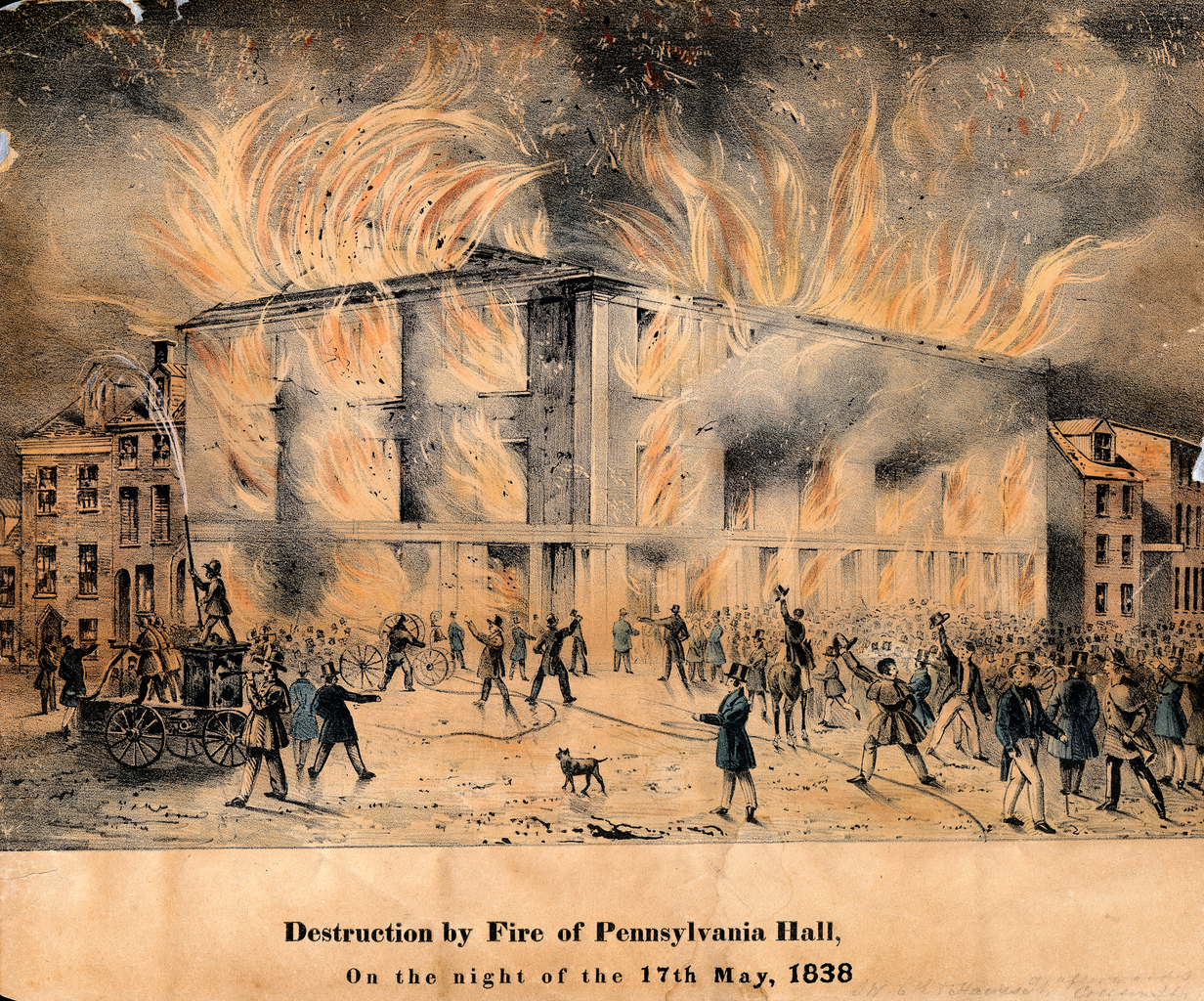
Burning of Pennsylvania Hall, print by John Caspar Wild. Note firemen spraying water on adjacent building.

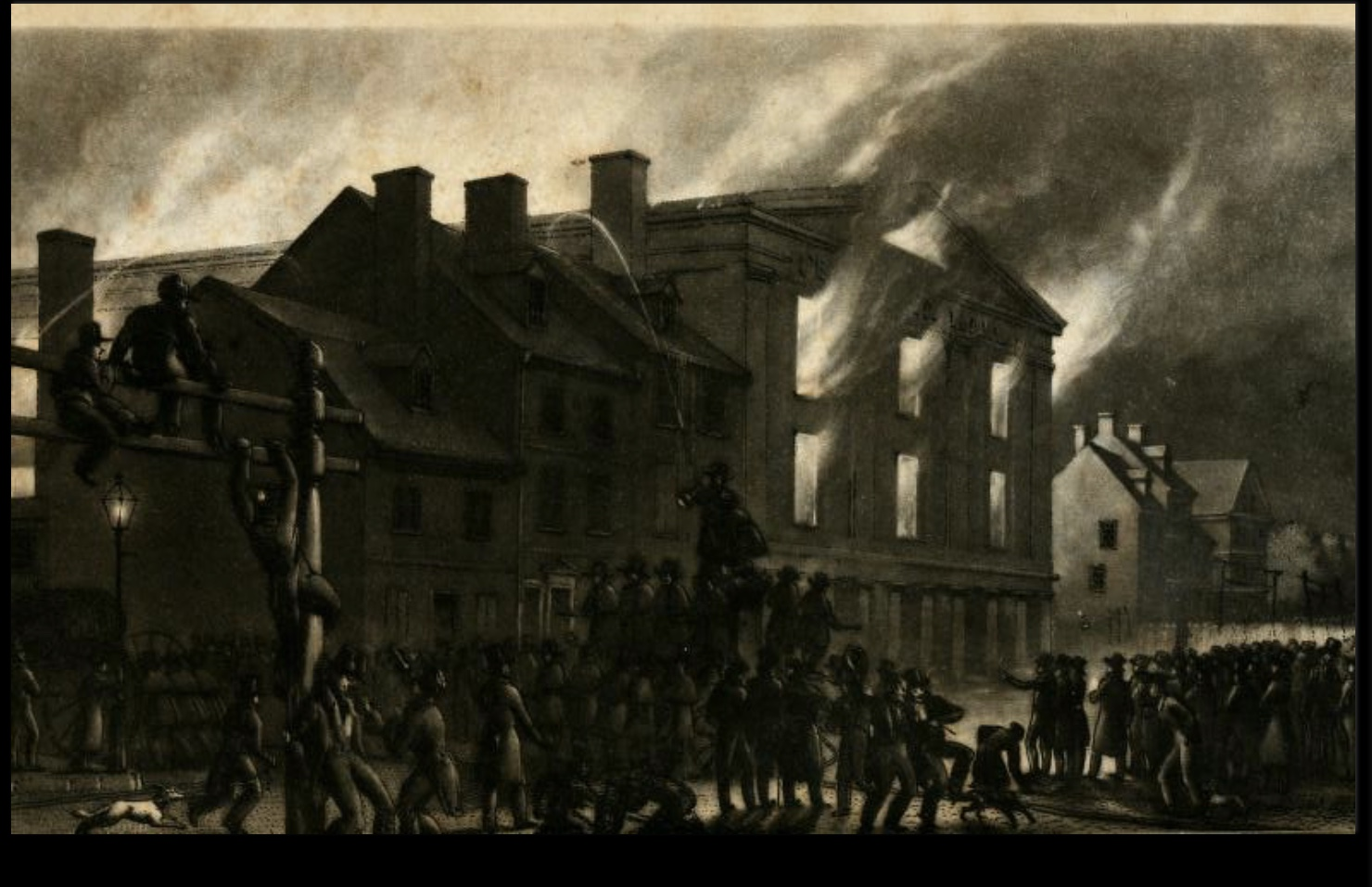
An engraving by John Sartain, an eyewitness. Note water directed toward adjacent building.

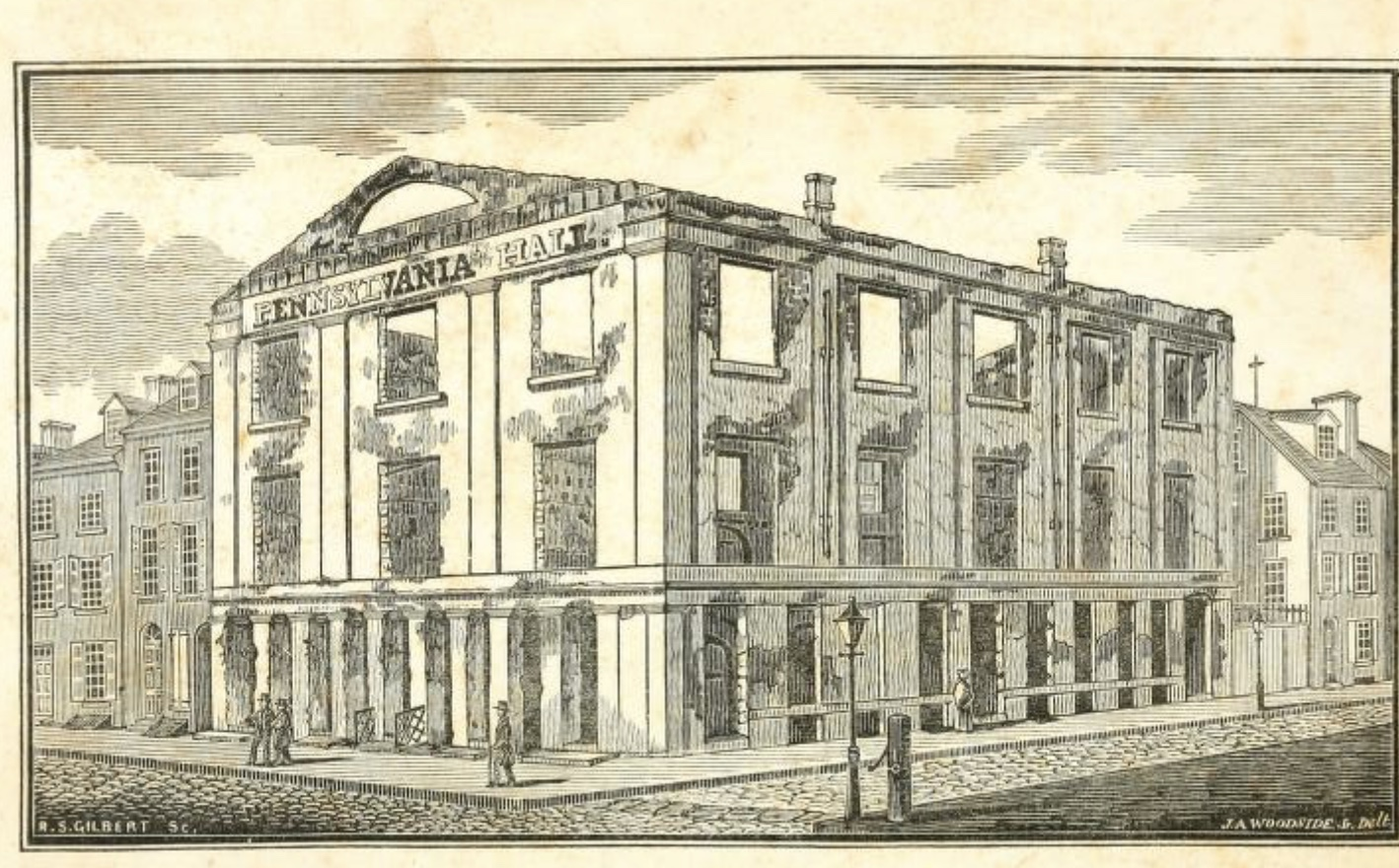
Pennsylvania Hall post-burning. Engraved by Reuben S. Gilbert after work by John Archibald Woodside, Jr.

=== Thursday, May 17 ===
- The Anti-Slavery Convention of American Women met again in the main room of the hall, having met in Temperance Hall on Wednesday. They "refused to comply with the Mayor's request to restrict the meeting to white women only."
- A Requited (paid, non-slave) Labor Convention, whose purpose was to create a National Requited Labor Association, met in a session room at 8 AM and in the Grand Saloon at 2 PM. (See Free-produce movement.)
- Managers met and decided to write letters to the mayor and the sheriff requesting protection. Three went to meet with the mayor, advised him of the situation, showed him the placard, and offered to "give him the name of one of the ringleaders of the mob." "The mayor gave little indication that he wanted to intervene. ...He said 'There are always two sides to a question — it is public opinion make mobs — and ninety-nine out of a hundred of those with whom I converse are against you.'" He said that in the evening he would address the crowd, but could do nothing further.
- The Wesleyan Antislavery Society of the Methodist Episcopal Church of Philadelphia was to meet in the evening.
- "On the 17th, early in the evening, the managers, at the request of John Swift, Mayor of the city, closed the Hall and delivered the keys to him — he having advised the abstaining from holding an evening meeting, as a necessary means for ensuring the safety of the building."
- "A large mob was assembled and was every moment increasing. The Mayor having taken the key, addressed the crowd in deferential language; and recommending to them to go home and go to bed, as he intended to do, he wished them 'a hearty good night', and left the ground amid the cheers of the assemblage. About half an hour afterwards, the doors were forced by the mob, and the Hall was set on fire, with little apparent resistance from the police." "No attempt of any kind was made to quell the riot," wrote an eyewitness.
- "The fire engines of the city repaired to the spot, and by their efforts protected the surrounding buildings. Many of the firemen were not disposed to extinguish the fire in the Hall, and some who attempted it were deterred by threats of violence." The firemen did not try to save the hall, but concentrated on saving the adjacent structures. "When one unit tried spraying the new building, its men became the target of the other units' hoses." As put in a letter from an eyewitness to the New Orleans True American:

A large number of splendid fire engines were immediately on the spot, many of which could throw water more than a hundred feet high: but the noble firemen, to a man, of all the numerous companies present, refused to throw one drop of water on the consuming building. All they did was to direct their engines to play upon the private buildings in the immediate vicinity of the blazing Hall, some of which were in great danger, as they were nearly joining the Hall. By the skil[l]ful exertion of these noble-hearted young men, however, no private property was suffered to receive the least damage — while the Hall was totally consumed with all its contents. Such conduct in the Philadelphia fire companies deserves the highest praise and gratitude of all the friends of the Union, and of all Southerners in particular.

- "The papers say that of the many thousands, who crowded in the vicinity to witness the conflagration of this beautiful edifice, the larger part were 'respectable and well dressed persons, who evidently looked on with approbation.' ...It is said that when the roof of this noble temple of liberty fell in there was a universal shout of triumph."

=== Friday, May 18 ===
- The following meetings had been announced for Friday: "To-morrow the State Anti-Slavery Society will meet at 8 o'clock, A.M. The Free Produce Convention at 10 o'clock. The Convention of American Women will meet at 1 o'clock, P.M. and the Free Produce Convention will meet at 4 o'clock in the afternoon, and the Pennsylvania State Anti Slavery Society will meet at 8 o'clock in the evening." On Monday the 21st there was to have been a debate between abolitionists and colonizationists.
- The attendees of the Requited Labor Convention assembled "at the ruins of the Pennsylvania Hall" and adjourned to the residence of James Mott, where a committee was set up to find a place for future meetings.
- "[T]he next night, the 18th, a body of entire strangers to the locality attacked and set fire to the Friends' charitable institution, called the Shelter for Colored Children, in Thirteenth Street above Callowhill, and considerably damaged the building before the fire was extinguished." It "was with difficulty preserved from utter conflagration by the spirited conduct of the firemen and the police magistrate of the district."

=== Saturday, May 19 ===
- "And the next evening, the 19th, Bethel Church, in South Sixth Street, belonging to colored people, was attacked and sustained injury.." "This would have shared the fate of Pennsylvania Hall, had not the Recorder of the city, with a spirit which does him great credit, interfered to do what the Mayor should have done on the first day, and forming a guard of well disposed citizens around the building, awed the rioters from their meditated violence."
- "From regulating the affairs of the church the mob proceeded to extend its cares to the public press. The Philadelphia Ledger had displeased it by the freedom of some of its remarks on the right of mobs to insult women and destroy property, and the office of the Philadelphia Ledger was accordingly doomed to destruction." However, no attack on it took place.

== Aftermath ==
The burning was greatly praised in Southern newspapers. A Northern newspaper, defending slavery, blamed the riot on the abolitionists.

=== Rewards ===
The mayor of Philadelphia, John Swift, offered a $2000 reward, and the Governor of Pennsylvania, Joseph Ritner, offered $500. Samuel Yaeger, described as "a man of considerable property, and the father of five children," was arrested. He is presumably the arrested "individual of good standing" who was observed "busily engaged in tearing down the blinds, and inciting others to the destruction of the building." Another man was arrested with him. Other arrests were made, but there were no trials, much less convictions, and the rewards were never claimed.

=== Investigation of the mayor and police ===
The mayor of Philadelphia, John Swift, received a lot of criticism in the press.

The mob burning the Hall gave "shouts of derision at the Mayor, who came forward to represent the majesty of the laws with no other preparation than a speech."

In the end, the city's official report blamed the fire and riots on the abolitionists, saying they had upset the citizens by encouraging "race mixing" and inciting violence.

=== Role of the sheriff ===
The Sheriff of Philadelphia County, John G. Watmough, in his report to the Governor, said: "I arrested with my own hands some ten or a dozen rioters; among them a sturdy blackguard engaged in forcing the doors with a log of wood, and a youth with a brand of fire in his hands. They were either forcibly rescued from me or were let loose again by those into whose hands I gave them. I appealed in vain for assistance—no one responded to me." However, "many individuals are already in custody."

Just after the burning a new fund was set up by the Philadelphia Hall Society to raise $50,000 [sic] with which to rebuild. Nothing further was heard of this attempt.

=== Efforts to recover damages from the city ===
All sources agree that since it was destroyed by a mob, the city was financially responsible for the building's damages, according to a recent law. After many years and much litigation the Anti-Slavery Society was able to recover a part of the loss from the city.

== National impact ==
"Ultimately the destruction of Pennsylvania Hall contributed to an awakening by the Northern public that was essential to the defeat of slavery." "The gutted shell stood for several years after the blaze, becoming a pilgrimage site for abolitionists." "In the destruction of this Hall consecrated to freedom, a fire has in fact been kindled that will never go out. The onward progress of our cause in the Key-stone State may now be regarded as certain."

"The Philadelphia Public Ledger, which was threatened with demolition by the rioters in the late mob, asserts that its daily circulation has augmented nearly two thousand since the disturbances, notwithstanding its uncompromising opposition to mobs."

== Primary sources ==
- Webb, Samuel, ed. (1838). History of Pennsylvania Hall, which was Destroyed by a Mob, on the 17th of May, 1838. Philadelphia: Philadelphia, Printed by Merrihew and Gunn.
- Boston Female Anti-Slavery Society (1838). Fifth Annual report of the Boston Female Anti-Slavery Society. Boston.
- Fall River Female Anti-Slavery Society (1838). Report of a delegate to the Anti-Slavery Convention of American Women : held in Philadelphia, May, 1838; including an account of other meetings held in Pennsylvania Hall, and of the riot : addressed to the Fall River Female Anti-Slavery Society, and published by its request. Boston: I. Knapp.
- Anti-Slavery Convention of American Women (1838). Proceedings of the [Second] Anti-slavery convention of American women, held in Philadelphia. May 15th, 16th, 17th and 18th, 1838. Philadelphia: Philadelphia, Printed by Merrihew and Gunn.
- Philadelphia (Pa.). Committee on Police. (July 18, 1838). "Report of the Committee on Police : on the circumstances attending and connected with the destruction of the Pennsylvania Hall, and other consequent disturbances of the peace [page 1 of 2]". Public Ledger (Philadelphia, Pennsylvania). pp. 1–2. (Page 2 is here). Also published as a pamphlet, OCLC 27720902.
- Watmough, John G. (1838). Address of John G. Watmough, high sheriff, to his constituents, with reference to the disturbances which took place in the City and County of Philadelphia, during the summer of 1838. Philadelphia: [Philadelphia] C. Alexander, printer.
- Minutes of proceedings of the Requited Labor Convention, held in Philadelphia, on the 17th and 18th of the Fifth month, and by adjournment on the 5th and 6th of the Ninth month, 1838. Philadelphia: Philadelphia, Printed by Merrihew and Gunn. 1838.

== Legacy ==
- "The Tocsin," by Rev. John Pierpont, on occasion of the Hall's destruction, was published anonymouslty in The Liberator of May 25.

== Historical marker ==
In 1992, the Pennsylvania Historical and Museum Commission erected a marker at the Hall's location. The marker reads: "Built on this site in 1838 by the Pennsylvania Anti-Slavery Society as a meeting place for abolitionists, this hall was burned to the ground by anti-Black rioters three days after it was first opened."

== See also ==
- Lombard Street riot (1842)
- Philadelphia Nativist Riots (1844)
