= Grimké sisters =

American speaker and activist sisters

External videos
- Presentation by Greenidge on The Grimkes: The Legacy of Slavery in an American Family, November 15, 2022, C-SPAN

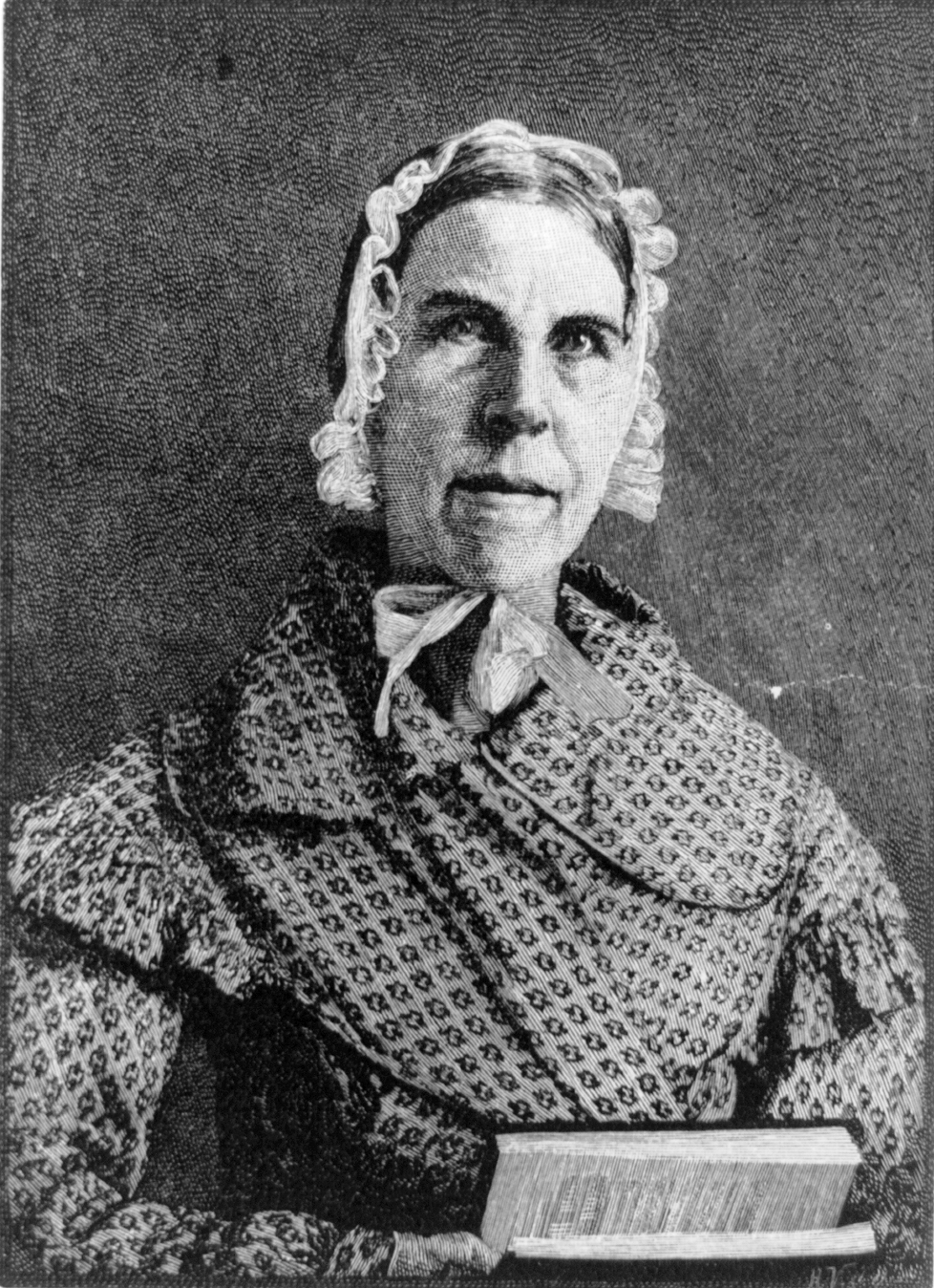
Sarah Moore Grimké

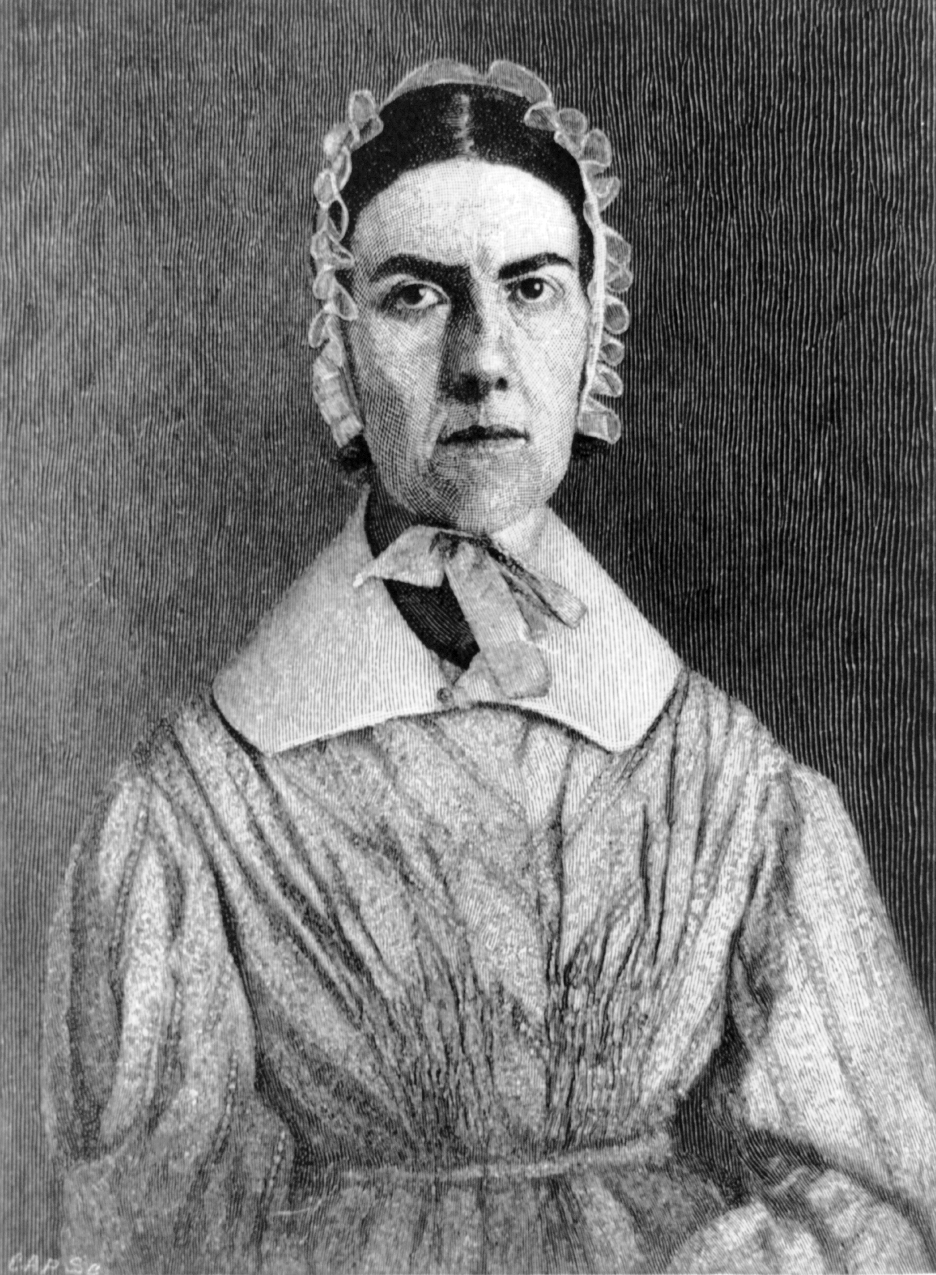
Angelina Emily Grimké

The Grimke sisters, Sarah Moore Grimké (1792–1873) and Angelina Emily Grimké (1805–1879), were American writers, educators, and public speakers, best known for their advocacy of abolitionism and women's rights.

Among the first American-born women to engage in public speaking tours, the sisters advocated through speech and writing for the civil rights of African Americans and civil rights for women, emphasizing the interconnectedness of these struggles. Sarah Grimké's pamphlet, The Equality of the Sexes and the Condition of Women, has been called "the first serious discussion of women's rights by an American woman."

The sisters grew up in a slave-owning family in South Carolina and became part of Philadelphia's substantial Quaker society in their twenties. The sisters, along with Angelina's husband, Theodore Dwight Weld, founded a private school in 1848 on their farm in Belleville, New Jersey.

== Early life, education, and family ==
Sarah Moore Grimké and Angelina Grimké Weld were born in Charleston, South Carolina. Sarah and Angelina's father, Judge John Faucheraud Grimké, was an advocate of slavery. He owned several plantations and hundreds of enslaved people. Grimké had 14 children with his wife Mary (née Smith) and at least three children with enslaved women. Three of his children died in infancy. Sarah was his sixth child with Mary, and Angelina was the thirteenth. In 1783, Judge John Faucheraud Grimké was elected as chief justice of the Supreme Court of South Carolina. In 1810, Sarah and Angelina's uncle, Benjamin Smith, served as governor of North Carolina.

Sarah recalled being skeptical of slavery from a young age. She later recounted that at age five, after witnessing a slave being whipped, she tried to board a steamer to live in a place without slavery. As she grew older, she attempted to teach enslaved people on her father's plantation how to read until her father discovered and forbade the attempts.

In her adolescence, Sarah wanted to become a lawyer and follow in her father's footsteps. She studied the books in her father's library, teaching herself geography, history, and mathematics. However, her father would not allow her to learn Latin or attend law school like her brother, Thomas Smith Grimké, due to institutional restrictions on women receiving higher education. Still, her father admired her intelligence and said that if she had been a man, she would have been the greatest lawyer in South Carolina.

After completing her studies, Sarah begged her parents to allow her to become Angelina's godmother. Sarah served as a role model to Angelina, and the two sisters maintained a close relationship throughout their lives. Angelina often referred to Sarah as "mother." Such relationships were not uncommon at the time; Carroll Smith-Rosenberg writes of boarding school girls "adopting" younger girls who called the older girls "mother."

Sarah became an abolitionist in 1821. Angelina followed her sister and became an active member of the movement. The sisters' conversion to Quakerism and subsequent move to Philadelphia made them virtual outcasts in the South. Angelina rose to notoriety in 1835 when William Lloyd Garrison published a letter of hers in his anti-slavery newspaper, The Liberator. In May 1838, she gave a speech to abolitionists, despite a hostile, stone-throwing crowd outside of Pennsylvania Hall. The essays and speeches she produced during this period argued for ending slavery and advancing women's rights.

Before the Civil War, the sisters discovered that their late brother Henry had a relationship with Nancy Weston, an enslaved mixed-race woman, after he became a widower. The two had lived together and had three mixed-race sons: Archibald, Francis, and John (who was born shortly after their father died). The sisters arranged for the oldest two nephews to come north for their education and helped support them. Francis J. Grimké became a Presbyterian minister who graduated from Lincoln University (Pennsylvania) and Princeton Theological Seminary. In December 1878, Francis married Charlotte Forten, a noted educator and author. The couple had one daughter, Theodora Cornelia, who died as an infant. Archibald also graduated from Lincoln University, followed by Harvard Law School. He served as American Consul to the Dominican Republic from 1894 to 1898. A daughter of Archibald, Angelina Weld Grimké, became a noted poet and playwright.

== Activism ==
Sarah first encountered the Quakers in 1818 during a trip to Philadelphia for medical care. The Quakers' views on slavery and gender intrigued her, particularly their religious values of sincerity, simplicity, and commitment to equality.

After her father's death that same year, Sarah returned to Charleston, where her anti-slavery sentiments deepened significantly and her abolitionist beliefs began to take root. These evolving views profoundly influenced her sister Angelina, who would later join her in advocating for abolition and gender equality. In February 1828, Angelina became the first woman to address the Massachusetts State Legislature when she brought an anti-slavery petition signed by 20,000 women to the governing body.

Sarah left Charleston for good in 1821, relocating to Philadelphia, with Angelina joining her in 1829. There, the sisters became involved in the Quaker community. Angelina's 1835 letter in support of the abolitionist movement to William Lloyd Garrison was published in The Liberator without her permission. Various members of the Quaker community asked Angelina to retract her radical statements, but she refused to change a word or remove her name from the letter.

Because of the Quakers' strict adherence to traditional manners and the expectation that individuals defer to the congregation before taking public action, both sisters were rebuked by the Quaker community. As the Grimké sisters' fame spread, a backlash against them grew. Many people were unhappy to see women taking a public role in social and political debates. They felt Sarah and Angelina were stepping too far outside of the behavior of "respectable women." Despite this rebuke, Sarah and Angelina were embraced by the wider abolitionist movement and started actively working to oppose slavery.

Leaving the Quaker community seemed to free both sisters of the many restrictions in their lives. They quickly channeled their physical and intellectual energy into activism. Abolitionist Theodore Weld, who would later marry Angelina in May of 1838, trained the sisters to be abolition speakers. In 1836, Sarah was rebuked by the Quakers again when she tried to discuss abolition in a meeting. When the Grimké sisters saw that black Quakers were segregated in the Philadelphia meeting house, they became disillusioned with Quakers.

The activism of the Grimké sisters was promoted by pastor Henry G. Ludlow. In 1837, they spoke at his Spring Street Presbyterian Church.

Following the earlier example of African American orator Maria W. Stewart of Boston, the Grimké sisters were among the first female public speakers in the United States. They first spoke exclusively to women at parlor meetings or sewing circles, adhering to contemporary rules of gender propriety. In one case, an interested man snuck into the meeting but was subsequently removed.

Angelina Grimké wrote her first tract, Appeal to the Christian Women of the South, in 1836 to encourage Southern women to join the abolitionist movement for the sake of white womanhood and Black slaves. Addressing Southern women, she began her piece by arguing that slavery was contrary to both the teachings of Jesus Christ and the United States Declaration of Independence statement that "all men are created equal." She discussed the damage both to slaves and to society, advocated teaching slaves to read, and urged her readers to free any slaves they might own. Although legal codes of slave states restricted or prohibited the latter two actions, Angelina urged her readers to ignore wrongful laws and do what was right: "Consequences, my friends, belong no more to you than they did to [the] apostles. Duty is ours, and events are God's." At the end of the tract, Angelina delivered a call to action, encouraging her readers to "arise and gird yourselves for this great moral conflict."

The sisters again sparked controversy when Sarah published Epistle to the Clergy of the Southern States in 1836 and Angelina republished her Appeal in 1837. That year, they went on a lecture tour to address Congregationalist churches in the Northeast United States. In addition to denouncing slavery, the sisters condemned racial prejudice and argued that white women had a natural bond with enslaved Black women, two ideas that were extreme even for radical abolitionists.

Their public speaking for the abolitionist cause continued to draw criticism, with each attack fueling the sisters' determination. Responding to Catharine Beecher's criticism of her public speaking, Angelina wrote a series of letters to Beecher – later published with the title Letters to Catharine Beecher – staunchly defending the abolitionist cause and her right to speak publicly. By the end of 1836, the sisters were denounced from Congregationalist pulpits. The following year, Sarah responded to the Congregationalist ministers' attacks by writing her own series of letters addressed to the president of the abolitionist society that sponsored their speeches. The series became known as Letters on the Equality of the Sexes, in which she defended women's right to the public platform.

By 1838, thousands of people came to hear their Boston lecture series. In 1839, the sisters and Angelina's husband, Theodore Weld, published American Slavery As It Is: Testimony of a Thousand Witnesses. For a time, Sarah, Angelina, and Theodore lived on a farm in New Jersey. The sisters taught at Eagleswood Military Academy, a coeducational and racially integrated school located at the Raritan Bay Union cooperative. The school was run by Theodore.

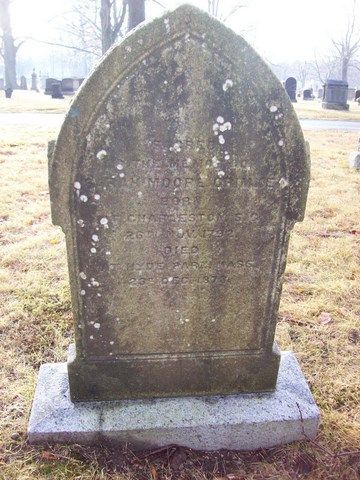
Sarah's Headstone

When Sarah was nearly 80, the sisters attempted to vote to test the 15th Amendment but were unsuccessful. Sarah Grimké died on December 23, 1873, in Suffolk, Massachusetts. The following year, Angelina suffered a paralyzing stroke that affected her until her death in 1879. At her own request, Angelina's grave was unmarked until the Hyde Park Historical Society installed a flat gravestone for her in 2021.

== Selections from writings ==
Angelina published her Appeal to the Christian Women of the South in 1836 before Sarah's similar work Letters on the Equality of the Sexes, and the Condition of Woman. Both texts emphasize the equality of men's and women's creation, but Sarah also asserts Adam's greater responsibility for the Fall of man. In Sarah's opinion, Eve, innocent of the ways of evil, was tempted by the serpent while Adam was tempted by a mere mortal. Because of the supernatural nature of her tempter, Eve's sinfulness can be more easily forgiven. Further, Adam should have tenderly reproved his wife and led them both away from sin. Hence, Adam failed in two ways. By analyzing the Hebrew text and by comparing the phrasing used there with the phrasing used in the story of Cain and Abel, Sarah found that God's "curse" is not actually a curse, but a prophecy. Her concluding thought asserts that women are bound to God alone.

From Angelina Grimké's "Letter XII Human Rights Not Founded on Sex" (October 2, 1837):

The regulation of duty by the mere circumstance of sex, rather than by the fundamental principle of moral being, has led to all that multifarious train of evils flowing out of the anti-Christian doctrine of masculine and feminine virtues. By this doctrine, man had been converted into the warrior, and clothed with sternness, and those other kindred qualities, which in common estimation belong to his character as a man; whilst woman has been taught to lean upon an arm of flesh, to sit as a doll arrayed in "gold, and pearls, and costly array," to be admired for her personal charms, and caressed and humoured like a spoiled child, or converted into a mere drudge to suit the convenience of her lord and master. Thus have all the diversified relations of life been filled with "confusion and every evil work." This principle has given to man a charter for the exercise of tyranny and selfishness, pride and arrogance, lust and brutal violence. It has robbed woman of essential rights, the right to think and speak and act on all great moral questions, just as men think and speak and act; the right to share their responsibilities, perils and toils; the right to fulfil the great end of her being, as a moral, intellectual and immortal creature, and of glorifying god in her body and her spirit which are His. Hitherto, instead of being a help meet to man, in the highest, noblest sense of the term as a companion, a co-worker, an equal; she has been a mere appendage of his being, an instrument of his convenience and pleasure, the pretty toy with which he whiled away his leisure moments, or the pet animal whom he humoured into playfulness and submission. Woman, instead of being regarded as the equal of man, has uniformly been looked down upon as his inferior, a mere gift to fill up the measure of his happiness. In "the poetry of romantic gallantry," it is true, she has been called "the last best gift of God to man"; but I believe I speak forth the words of truth and soberness when I affirm, that woman never was given to man. She was created, like him, in the image of God, and crowned with glory and honour; created only a little lower than the angels, – not, as is almost universally assumed, a little lower than man; on her brow, as well as on his, was placed the "diadem of beauty," and in her hand the scepter of universal dominion. Gen 1: 27, 28. "The last best gift of God to man"! Where is the scripture warrant for this "rhetorical flourish, this splendid absurdity?" Let us examine the account of the creation. "And the rib which the Lord God had taken from man, made he a woman, and brought her unto the man." Not as a gift – for Adam immediately recognised her as part of himself – ("this is now bone of my bone, and flesh of my flesh") – a companion and equal, not one hair's breadth beneath him in the majesty and glory of her moral being; not placed under his authority as a subject, but by his side, on the same platform of human rights, under the government of God only. This idea of woman's being "the last gift of God to man," however pretty it may sound to the ears of those who love to discourse upon. " The poetry of romantic gallantry, and the generous promptings of chivalry," has nevertheless been the means of sinking her from an end into a mere means – of turning her into an appendage to man, instead of recognising her as a part of man – of destroying her individuality, and rights, and responsibilities, and merging her moral being in that of man. Instead of Jehovah being her king, her lawgiver, her judge, she has been taken out of the exalted scale of existence in which He placed her, and subjected to the despotic control of man.

Additionally, Angelina wrote: "...whatever is morally right for a man to do, it is morally right for a woman to do. I recognize no rights but human rights – I know nothing of men's rights and women's rights; for in Christ Jesus, there is neither male nor female."

I prize the purity of his character as highly as I do that of hers. As a moral being, whatever it is morally wrong for her to do, it is morally wrong for him to do.

In response to a letter from a group of ministers who cited the Bible to reprimand the sisters for stepping out of "woman's proper sphere," Sarah Grimké wrote the following in Letters on the Equality of the Sexes and the Condition of Woman in 1838:

Men and women were CREATED EQUAL.... Whatever is right for a man, it's right for a woman. I will not seek any sex-related favors. I will not surrender our right to equality. All I ask of our brethren is that they will take their feet off our necks and permit us to stand upright on that ground which God destined us to occupy.

== Legacy ==
- In 1880, Theodore Weld published a volume titled In Memory: Angelina Grimké Weld.
- The first volume of History of Woman Suffrage, published in 1881, is inscribed to the memory of the Grimké sisters, among others.
- In 1973 Ruth Bader Ginsburg quoted Sarah Grimké as saying, "I ask for no favor for my sex. All I ask of our brethren is that they take their feet off our necks," when Ginsburg gave her first oral arguments to the Supreme Court in Frontiero v. Richardson; the quote was also recited by an actress playing Ginsburg in the film RBG (2018).
- The Grimké sisters and Theodore Dwight Weld are featured prominently in the juvenile fiction book The Forge and the Forest (1975) by Betty Underwood.
- Angelina Grimké is memorialized in Judy Chicago's 1979 artwork The Dinner Party.
- In 1998, the Grimké sisters were inducted into the National Women's Hall of Fame.
- The Grimké sisters appear as main characters in Ain Gordon's 2013 play If She Stood, commissioned by the Painted Bride Art Center in Philadelphia, Pennsylvania.
- Sue Monk Kidd's 2014 novel The Invention of Wings is based on the life of Sarah Grimké.
- In 2016, Angelina Grimké was inducted into the National Abolition Hall of Fame.
- "The Grimké Sisters at Work on Theodore Dwight Weld's American Slavery As It Is (1838)" is a poem by Melissa Range, published in the September 30, 2019, issue of The Nation.
- In November 2019, a newly reconstructed bridge over the Neponset River in Hyde Park was renamed for the Grimké sisters. It is now known as the Grimké Sisters Bridge.
- The Grimké sisters are remembered on the Boston Women's Heritage Trail.

== Archival material ==
The papers of the Grimké family are in the South Carolina Historical Society, Charleston, South Carolina. The Weld-Grimké papers are in the William L. Clements Library, University of Michigan, Ann Arbor, Michigan. Papers of Sarah Grimké are held by the University of Texas Library, Austin, Texas. The Library of Congress holds five letters from Sarah Grimké to Sarah Mapps Douglass.
