= Charles Burleigh =

American abolitionist

Charles Calistus Burleigh
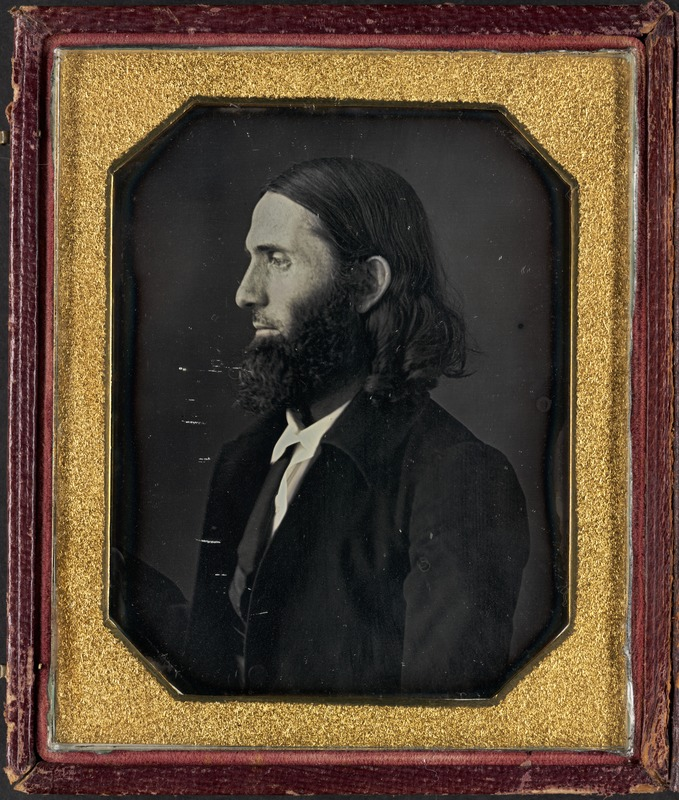
- Burleigh in the late 1840s
- Born: November 3, 1810; Plainfield, Connecticut
- Died: June 13, 1878 (aged 67); Florence, Massachusetts
- Other name: C. C. Burleigh
- Occupations: journalist, orator, abolitionist

Charles Calistus Burleigh (November 3, 1810 – June 13, 1878) was an American journalist and abolitionist who fought against Connecticut's "Black Law" and enlisted participants in the Underground Railroad.

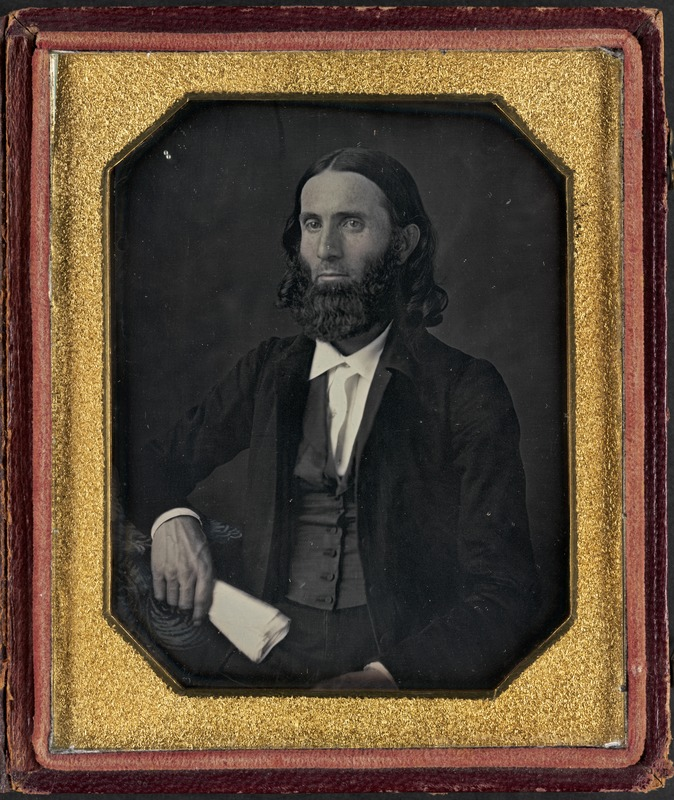
Charles Calistus Burleigh, 1845–1850. Print Department Collection., Boston Public Library

Burleigh was drawn into abolitionist work because of the racist persecution and harassment of Prudence Crandall when she tried to open a school for educating young Black women in Canterbury, Connecticut. Burleigh wrote an article denouncing the actions of the Connecticut authorities for a newspaper called The Genius of Temperance, which led to him being asked in 1833 to be the editor of a fledgling newspaper The Unionist, out of Brooklyn, Connecticut (home of Crandall's supporter Samuel May).

Burleigh was the antislavery editor of The Unionist and also the editor of The Pennsylvania Freeman after 1844. He served as secretary of the American Anti-Slavery Society beginning in 1836, and was the editor of its annual reports. He traveled around the Northeast, particularly in Pennsylvania, visiting antislavery societies and helping other groups to organize their own anti-slavery groups. At the American Anti-Slavery Society convention in 1837 he promoted a resolution which called for allowing alleged fugitive slaves the right of trial by jury, he denounced the sin of slaveholding, and specifically highlighted contributions that women were making to the antislavery cause.

Burleigh was a campaigner on many topics. He published a book, Thoughts on the Death Penalty, an early argument against capital punishment. He was also in favor of women's rights and participated in the 1850 National Women's Rights Convention in Worcester, Massachusetts. He was known as an effective and colorful orator, with very long hair and beard that he had vowed not to cut until slavery had ended in the United States.

== Personal life ==
Burleigh was born in Plainfield, Connecticut, to Rinaldo Burleigh and Lydia Bradford, one of eight children including abolitionist Cyrus M. Burleigh. He attended Plainfield Academy and studied law; he was admitted to the bar in Connecticut in 1835. He married Gertrude Kimber, a Quaker from Chester County, Pennsylvania, on October 24, 1842, and they had three children, including the artist Charles Calistus Burleigh, Jr. He was killed by a passing railroad train in Florence, Massachusetts, in 1878.
