= Angelina Grimké =

American abolitionist and feminist (1805–1879)

Angelina Emily Grimké
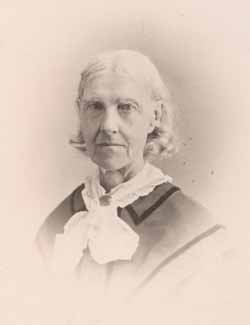
- Born: February 20, 1805; Charleston, South Carolina, U.S.
- Died: October 26, 1879 (aged 74); Hyde Park, Massachusetts, U.S.
- Occupations: Politician, abolitionist, suffragist
- Spouse: Theodore Dwight Weld (m. 1838)
- Children: 3

Angelina Emily Grimké Weld (February 20, 1805 – October 26, 1879) was an American abolitionist, political activist, women's rights advocate, and supporter of the women's suffrage movement. At one point she was the best known, or "most notorious," woman in the country. She and her sister Sarah Moore Grimké were considered the only notable examples of white Southern women abolitionists. The sisters lived together as adults, while Angelina was the wife of abolitionist leader Theodore Dwight Weld.

Although raised in Charleston, South Carolina, Angelina and Sarah spent their entire adult lives in the North. Angelina's greatest fame was between 1835, when William Lloyd Garrison published a letter of hers in his anti-slavery newspaper The Liberator, and May 1838, when she gave a speech to abolitionists with a hostile, noisy, stone-throwing crowd outside Pennsylvania Hall. The essays and speeches she produced in that period were incisive arguments to end slavery and to advance women's rights.

Drawing her views from natural rights theory (as set forth in the Declaration of Independence), the United States Constitution, Christian beliefs in the Bible, and her own childhood memories of the cruel slavery and racism in the South, Grimké proclaimed the injustice of denying freedom to any man or woman. When challenged for speaking in public to mixed audiences of men and women in 1837, she and her sister Sarah fiercely defended women's right to make speeches and participate in political discourse.

In May 1838, Angelina married Theodore Dwight Weld, a prominent abolitionist. They lived in New Jersey with her sister Sarah and raised three children, Charles Stuart (1839), Theodore Grimké (1841), and Sarah Grimké Weld (1844). They earned a living by running two schools, the latter located in the Raritan Bay Union utopian community. After the Civil War ended, the Grimké–Weld household moved to Hyde Park, Massachusetts, where they spent their final years. Angelina and Sarah were active in the Massachusetts Woman Suffrage Association.

== Family background ==
Grimké was born in Charleston, South Carolina, to John Faucheraud Grimké and Mary Smith, both from wealthy planter families. Her father was an Anglican lawyer, planter, politician, and judge, a Revolutionary War veteran, and a distinguished member of Charleston society. Her mother Mary was a descendant of South Carolina Governor Thomas Smith. Her parents owned a plantation and were major slaveholders. Angelina was the youngest of 14 children. Her father believed women should be subordinate to men and provided education to only his male children, but the boys shared their studies with their sisters.

== Early years and religious activity ==
Both Mary and John Grimké were strong advocates of the traditional, upper-class, Southern values that permeated their rank of Charleston society. Mary would not permit the girls to socialize outside the prescribed elite social circles, and John remained a slaveholder his entire life.

Nicknamed "Nina", young Angelina Grimké was very close to her older sister Sarah Moore Grimké, who, at the age of 13, persuaded her parents to allow her to be Angelina's godmother. The two sisters maintained a close relationship throughout their lives, and lived together for most of their lives, albeit with several short periods of separation.

Even as a child, Angelina was described in family letters and diaries as the most self-righteous, curious, and self-assured of all her siblings. In her biography The Grimké Sisters from South Carolina, historian Gerda Lerner writes: "It never occurred to [Angelina] that she should abide by the superior judgment of her male relatives or that anyone might consider her inferior, simply for being a girl." More so than her elder sister (and later, fellow abolitionist) Sarah, Angelina seemed to be naturally inquisitive and outspoken, a trait which often offended her traditional family and friends.

When the time came for her confirmation in the Episcopal Church at the age of 13, Angelina refused to recite the creed of faith. An inquisitive and rebellious girl, she concluded that she could not agree with it and would not complete the confirmation ceremony. Angelina converted to the Presbyterian faith in April 1826, aged 21.

Angelina was an active member of the Presbyterian church. A proponent of biblical study and interfaith education, she taught a Sabbath school class and also provided religious services to her family's slaves—a practice her mother originally frowned upon, but later participated in. Grimké became a close friend of the pastor of her church, Rev. William McDowell. McDowell was a Northerner who had previously been the pastor of a Presbyterian church in New Jersey. Grimké and McDowell were both very opposed to the institution of slavery, on the grounds that it was a morally deficient system that violated Christian law and human rights. McDowell advocated patience and prayer over direct action and argued that abolishing slavery "would create even worse evils". This position was unacceptable to the young Angelina.

In 1829, she addressed the issue of slavery at a meeting in her church and said that all members of the congregation should openly condemn the practice. Because she was such an active member of the church community, her audience was respectful when it declined her proposal. By this time the church had come to terms with slavery, finding biblical justification and urging good Christian slaveholders to exercise paternalism and improve the treatment of their slaves. But Angelina lost faith in the values of the Presbyterian church and in 1829 she was officially expelled. With her sister Sarah's support, Angelina adopted the tenets of the Quaker faith. The Quaker community was very small in Charleston, and she quickly set out to reform her friends and family. However, given her self-righteous nature, her condescending comments about others tended to offend more than persuade. After deciding that she could not fight slavery while living in the South among white slaveowners, she followed her older sister Sarah to Philadelphia. She would never see Charleston or her mother again.

== Activism ==
The Grimké sisters joined a Philadelphia chapter of the Quakers. During this period, they remained relatively ignorant of certain political issues and debates; the only periodical they read regularly was The Friend, the weekly paper of the Society of Friends. The Friend provided limited information on current events and discussed them only within the context of the Quaker community. Thus, at the time, Grimké was unaware of (and therefore uninfluenced by) events such as the Webster–Hayne debates and the Maysville Road veto, as well as controversial public figures such as Frances Wright.

For a time in Philadelphia, Angelina lived with her widowed sister, Anna Grimké Frost. The younger woman was struck by the lack of options for widowed women, which during this period were mostly limited to remarriage. Generally, women of the upper classes did not work outside the home. Realizing the importance of education, Angelina decided to become a teacher. She briefly considered attending the Hartford Female Seminary, an institution founded and run by her future adversary Catharine Beecher, but she remained in Philadelphia for the time being.

Over time, she became frustrated by the Quaker community's lack of involvement in the contemporary debate on slavery. In the first two decades after the Revolution, its preachers had traveled in the South to preach manumission of slaves, but increased demand in the domestic market with the development of cotton in the Deep South ended that window of freedom. She began to read more abolitionist literature, including the periodicals The Emancipator and William Lloyd Garrison's The Liberator (in which she would later be published). Sarah and the traditional Quakers disapproved of Angelina's interest in radical abolitionism, but she became steadily more involved in the movement. She began to attend anti-slavery meetings and lectures, and joined the newly organized Philadelphia Female Anti-Slavery Society in 1835.

In the fall of 1835, violence erupted when the controversial abolitionist George Thompson spoke in public. William Lloyd Garrison wrote an article in The Liberator in the hopes of calming the rioting masses. Angelina had been steadily influenced by Garrison's work, and this article inspired her to write him a personal letter on the subject. The letter stated her concerns and opinions on the issues of abolitionism and mob violence, as well as her personal admiration for Garrison and his values. Garrison was so impressed with Grimké's letter, which he called "soul-thrilling," that he published it in the next issue of The Liberator, praising her for her passion, expressive writing style, and noble ideas. The letter, reprinted in the New York Evangelist and elsewhere, gave Angelina great standing among many abolitionists, but its publication offended and stirred controversy within the Orthodox Quaker meeting, which openly condemned such radical activism, especially by a woman. Sarah Grimké asked her sister to withdraw the letter, concerned that such publicity would alienate her from the Quaker community. Though initially embarrassed by the letter's publication, Angelina refused. The letter was later reprinted in the New York Evangelist and other abolitionist papers; it was also included in a pamphlet with Garrison's Appeal to the Citizens of Boston. In 1836, Grimké wrote "An Appeal to the Christian Women of the South", urging Southern women to petition their state legislatures and church officials to end slavery. It was published by the American Anti-Slavery Society. Scholars consider it a high point of Grimké's sociopolitical agenda.

In the fall of 1836, the Grimké sisters were invited to Ohio to attend the American Anti-Slavery Society's two-week training conference for anti-slavery agents; they were the only women in the group. There they met Theodore Dwight Weld, a trainer and one of the Society's leading agents; Angelina and Theodore later married. During the following winter, the sisters were commissioned to speak at women's meetings and organize women's anti-slavery societies in the New York City region and nearby New Jersey. In May, 1837, they joined leading women abolitionists from Boston, New York, and Philadelphia in holding the first Anti-Slavery Convention of American Women, held to expand women's anti-slavery actions to other states.

Immediately after this convention, the sisters went by invitation of the Boston Female Anti-Slavery Society to Massachusetts. New England abolitionists were accused of distorting and exaggerating the realities of slavery, and the sisters were asked to speak throughout New England on their firsthand knowledge. Almost from the beginning, their meetings were open to men. Although defenders later claimed that the sisters addressed mixed audiences only because men insisted on coming, primary evidence indicates that their meetings were open to men by deliberate design, not only to carry their message to male as well as female hearers, but as a means of breaking women's fetters and establish "a new order of things." Thus, in addition to petitioning, women were transgressing social mores by speaking in public. In response, a state convention of Massachusetts' Congregational ministers, meeting at the end of June, issued a pastoral letter condemning public work by women and urging local churches to close their doors to the Grimkés' presentations.

As the sisters spoke throughout Massachusetts during the summer of 1837, the controversy over women abolitionists' public and political work fueled a growing controversy over women's rights and duties, both within and outside the anti-slavery movement. Angelina responded to Catharine Beecher's letter with open letters of her own, Letters to Catharine Beecher, printed first in The New England Spectator and The Liberator, and then in book form in 1838. Sarah Grimké wrote Letters on the Province of Woman, addressed to Mary S. Parker, which appeared first in the Liberator before being published in book form. Addressed to the president of the Boston Female Anti-Slavery Society, who in the wake of the pastoral letter wanted women abolitionists to withdraw from public work, Sarah's letters were a strong defense of women's right and duty to participate on equal terms with men in all such work.

In February 1838, Angelina addressed a committee of the Massachusetts State Legislature, becoming the first woman in the United States to address a legislative body. She not only spoke against slavery, but defended women's right to petition, both as a moral-religious duty and as a political right. Abolitionist Robert F. Wallcut stated that "Angelina Grimké's serene, commanding eloquence enchained attention, disarmed prejudice and carried her hearers with her."

On May 17, 1838, two days after her marriage, Angelina spoke at a racially integrated abolitionist gathering at the new Pennsylvania Hall in Philadelphia. As she spoke, an unruly mob outside of the hall grew more and more aggressive, shouting threats at Angelina and the other attendees. Rather than stop her speech, Angelina incorporated their interruptions into her speech:

Men, brethren and fathers -- mothers, daughters and sisters, what came ye out for to see? A reed shaken with the wind? Is it curiosity merely, or a deep sympathy with the perishing slave, that has brought this large audience together? [A yell from the mob without the building.] Those voices without ought to awaken and call out our warmest sympathies. Deluded beings! "they know not what they do." They know not that they are undermining their own rights and their own happiness, temporal and eternal. Do you ask, "what has the North to do with slavery?" Hear it -- hear it. Those voices without tell us that the spirit of slavery is here, and has been roused to wrath by our abolition speeches and conventions: for surely liberty would not foam and tear herself with rage, because her friends are multiplied daily, and meetings are held in quick succession to set forth her virtues and extend her peaceful kingdom. This opposition shows that slavery has done its deadliest work in the hearts of our citizens.

Rioters outside the building began to throw bricks and stones, breaking the windows of the hall. Angelina continued the speech, and after her conclusion, the abolitionist women left the building arm-in-arm, a white woman with a Black woman, for the latter's protection. Within hours, Pennsylvania Hall was destroyed by arson. Angelina was the final speaker in the Hall.

Angelina's lectures were critical not only of Southern slaveholders but also of Northerners who tacitly complied with the status quo, by purchasing slave-made products and exploiting slaves through the commercial and economic exchanges they made with slave owners in the South. They were met with a considerable amount of opposition, both because Angelina was a female and because she was an abolitionist.

== Major writings ==
Two of Grimké's most notable works were her essay "An Appeal to the Christian Women of the South" and her series of letters to Catharine Beecher.

=== An Appeal to the Christian Women of the South (1836) ===
An Appeal to the Christian Women of the South, published by the American Anti-Slavery Society, is unique because it is the only written appeal made by a Southern woman to other Southern women regarding the abolition of slavery, written in the hope that Southern women would not be able to resist an appeal made by one of their own. The style of the essay is very personal in nature and uses simple language and firm assertions to convey her ideas. Angelina's Appeal was widely distributed by the American Anti-Slavery Society, and was received with great acclaim by radical abolitionists. However, it was also received with great criticism by her former Quaker community and was publicly burned in South Carolina.

The Appeal makes seven main arguments:

- First: that slavery is contrary to the Declaration of Independence;
- Second: that slavery is contrary to the first charter of human rights bestowed upon man in the Bible;
- Third: that the argument that slavery was prophesied, gives no excuse to slaveholders for encroaching on another man's natural rights;
- Fourth: that slavery was never supposed to exist under patriarchal dispensation;
- Fifth: that slavery never existed under Hebrew Biblical law;
- Sixth: that slavery in America "reduces man to a thing";
- Seventh, that slavery is contrary to the teachings of Jesus Christ and his apostles.

In this way, and as a devout believer, Angelina uses the beliefs of the Christian religion to attack the idea of slavery:

Did not Jesus condemn slavery? Let us examine some of his precepts. "Whatsoever ye would that men should do to you, do ye even so to them", Let every slaveholder apply these queries to his own heart; Am I willing to be a slave—Am I willing to see my wife the slave of another—Am I willing to see my mother a slave, or my father, my sister or my brother? If not, then in holding others as slaves, I am doing what I would not wish to be done to me or any relative I have; and thus have I broken this golden rule which was given me to walk by.

— "An Appeal to the Christian Women of the South" (1836)

After walking through the seven-step theological argument against slavery, Angelina states the reasons for directing her plea toward Southern women in particular. She acknowledges a foreseeable objection: that even if a Southern woman agrees that slavery is sinful, she has no legislative power to enact change. To this, Grimké responds that a woman has four duties on the issue: to read, to pray, to speak, and to act. While women do not have the political power to enact change on their own, she points out that these women are "the wives and mothers, the sisters and daughters of those who do." Her vision, however, was not so simple as what would later be called "Republican Motherhood." She also exhorts women to speak and act on their moral opposition to slavery and to endure whatever persecution might result as a consequence. She dismisses the notion that women are too weak to withstand such consequences. Thus, she proposes the notion of women as empowered political actors on the slavery issue, without even touching on the question of suffrage.

Angelina also states, in a reply letter to Catharine E. Beecher, what she believes to be the abolitionist's definition of slavery: "Man cannot rightfully hold his fellow man as property. Therefore, we affirm that every slaveholder is a man-stealer; To steal a man is to rob him of himself." She reiterates well-known principles from the Declaration of Independence regarding the equality of man. Grimké argues that "a man is a man, and as a man he has inalienable rights, among which is the right to personal liberty ... No circumstances can ever justify a man in holding his fellow man as property ... The claim to him as property is an annihilation of his rights to himself, which is the foundation upon which all his other rights are built."

The essay also reflects Angelina's lifelong enthusiasm for the universal education of women and slaves. Her Appeal emphasizes the importance of women's educating their slaves or future laborers: "Should [your slaves] remain [in your employ] teach them, and have them taught the common branches of an English education; they have minds and those minds, ought to be improved."

=== Letters to Catharine Beecher ===
Angelina's Letters to Catharine Beecher began as a series of essays made in response to Beecher's An Essay on Slavery and Abolitionism with Reference to the Duty of American Females, which was addressed directly to Grimké. The series of responses that followed Beecher's essay were written with the moral support of her future husband, Weld, and were published in both The Emancipator and The Liberator before being reprinted as a whole in book form by Isaac Knapp, the Liberator's printer, in 1838.

Beecher's essay argues against the participation of women in the abolitionist movement on the grounds that women hold a subordinate position to men as "a beneficent and immutable Divine law". It argues, "Men are the proper persons to make appeals to the rulers whom they appoint ... [females] are surely out of their place in attempting to do it themselves." Grimké's responses were a defense of both abolitionist and feminist movements. The arguments made in support of abolitionism reflect many of the points that Weld made in the Lane Seminary debates. Openly critical of the American Colonization Society, Grimké states her personal appreciation for people of color and writes, "[I]t is because I love the colored Americans that I want them to stay in this country; and in order to make it a happy home to them, I am trying to talk down, and write down, and live down this horrible prejudice."

Angelina's Letters are recognized widely as an early feminist argument, although only two of the letters address feminism and woman's suffrage. Letter XII reflects some of the rhetorical style of the Declaration of Independence and is indicative of Grimké's religious values. She argues that all humans are moral beings and should be judged as such, regardless of their sex: "Measure her rights and duties by the unerring standard of moral being ... and then the truth will be self-evident, that whatever it is morally right for a man to do, it is morally right for a woman to do. I recognize no rights but human rights—I know nothing of men's rights and women's rights; for in Christ Jesus, there is neither male nor female. It is my solemn conviction, that, until this principle of equality is recognized and embodied in practice, the Church can do nothing effectual for the permanent reformation of the world."

Grimké directly responds to Beecher's traditionalist argument on the place of women in all spheres of human activity: "I believe it is the woman's right to have a voice in all the laws and regulations by which she is to be governed, whether in Church or State: and that the present arrangements of society, on these points, are a violation of human rights, a rank usurpation of power, a violent seizure and confiscation of what is sacredly and inalienably hers."

=== American Slavery as It Is ===
In 1839 she, her husband Theodore Dwight Weld and her sister Sarah published American Slavery as It Is, an encyclopedia of slave mistreatment, which became the second most important work of abolitionist literature after Uncle Tom's Cabin (1852), of Harriet Beecher Stowe, who recorded her indebtedness to American Slavery as It Is.

== Personal life ==
In 1831, Grimké was courted by Edward Bettle, the son of Samuel Bettle and Jane Temple Bettle, a family of prominent Orthodox Friends. Diaries show that Bettle intended to marry Grimké, though he never actually proposed. Sarah supported the match. However, in the summer of 1832, a large cholera epidemic broke out in Philadelphia. Grimké agreed to take in Bettle's cousin Elizabeth Walton, who, unbeknownst to anyone at the time, was dying of the disease. Bettle, who regularly visited his cousin, contracted the disease and died from it shortly thereafter. Grimké was heartbroken and directed all of her energy into her activism.

Grimké first met Theodore Weld in October 1836, at an abolitionist training meeting in Ohio that Weld was leading, She was greatly impressed with Weld's speeches and wrote in a letter to a friend that he was "a man raised up by God and wonderfully qualified to plead the cause of the oppressed." In the two years before they married, Weld encouraged Grimké's activism, arranging for many of her lectures and the publication of her writings. They confessed their love for each other in letters in February 1838. Grimké wrote to Weld stating she didn't know why he did not like her. He replied "you are full of pride and anger" and then in letters twice the size of the rest he wrote: "And I have loved you since the first time I met you." On May 14, 1838, two days before her speech at Pennsylvania Hall, they were married in Philadelphia, writing—actually improvising—their vows, with a black minister and a white minister leading the guests in prayer.

Although Weld was said to have been supportive of Angelina's desire to remain politically active after their marriage, she eventually retreated to a life of domesticity due to failing health. Sarah lived with the couple in New Jersey, and the sisters continued to correspond and visit with their friends in the abolitionist and emerging women's rights movements. They operated a school in their home, and later a boarding school at Raritan Bay Union, a utopian community. At the school, they taught the children of other noted abolitionists, including Elizabeth Cady Stanton. In the years after the Civil War, they raised funds to pay for the graduate education of their two mixed-race nephews, the sons of their brother Henry W. Grimké (1801–1852) and an enslaved woman he owned. The sisters paid for Archibald Henry Grimké and Rev. Francis James Grimké to attend Harvard Law School and Princeton Theological Seminary, respectively. Archibald became a lawyer and later an ambassador to Haiti and Francis became a Presbyterian minister. Both became leading civil rights activists. Archibald's daughter, Angelina Weld Grimké, became a poet and author.

Sarah Grimké died in 1873. The following year, Angelina suffered a paralyzing stroke, which afflicted her until her death. Her grave is unmarked, apparently at her own request. In 1880, Weld published an In memory volume, containing the remarks from her funeral and Sarah's, and others that had been contributed.

== Archival material ==
The papers of the Grimké family are in the South Carolina Historical Society, Charleston, South Carolina. The Weld–Grimké papers are at the William L. Clements Library, University of Michigan, Ann Arbor, MI.

== Legacy ==
In 1880, Theodore Weld published a volume titled In Memory: Angelina Grimké Weld.

The first volume of History of Woman Suffrage, published in 1881, is inscribed to the memory of the Grimké sisters, among others.

The Grimké sisters and Theodore Dwight Weld are featured prominently in the juvenile fiction book The Forge and the Forest (1975) by Betty Underwood.

Angelina Grimké is memorialized in Judy Chicago's 1979 artwork The Dinner Party.

In 1998, the Grimké sisters were inducted into the National Women's Hall of Fame.

The Grimké sisters appear as main characters in Ain Gordon's 2013 play If She Stood, commissioned by the Painted Bride Art Center in Philadelphia.

In 2016 Angelina Grimké was inducted into the National Abolition Hall of Fame.

"The Grimké Sisters at Work on Theodore Dwight Weld’s American Slavery As It Is (1838)" is a poem by Melissa Range, published in the September 30, 2019, issue of The Nation.

In November 2019, a newly reconstructed bridge over the Neponset River in Hyde Park was renamed for the Grimké sisters. It is now known as the Grimké Sisters Bridge.

The Grimké sisters are remembered on the Boston Women's Heritage Trail.

In 2024, a play recounting her speech was performed in the space where Angelina spoke to the Massachusetts Senate chamber; A Light Under the Dome was written by Patrick Gabridge and directed by Courtney O'Connor, and starring Amanda Collins as Angelina.

== See also ==
- Grimké sisters
- Carrie Chapman Catt
