= American Slavery as It Is =

Book by Theodore Dwight Weld

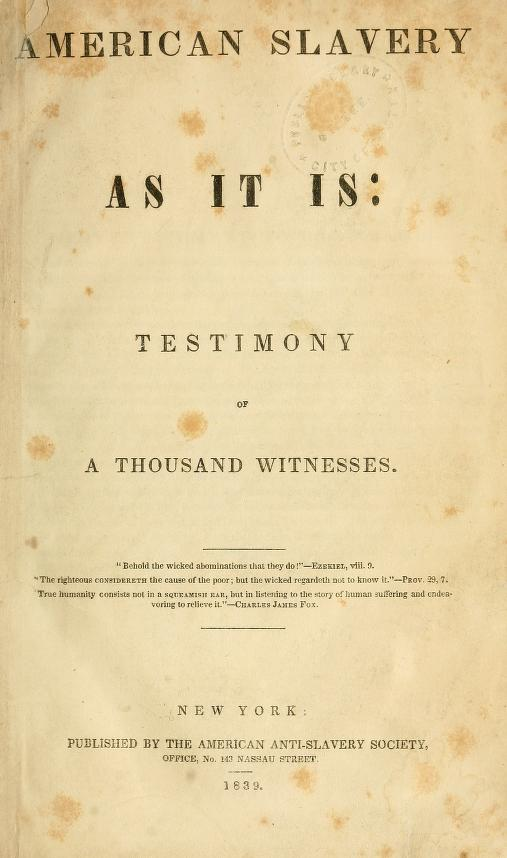
- Authors: Theodore Dwight Weld, Angelina and Sarah Grimké
- Original title: American Slavery As It Is: Testimony of a Thousand Witnesses
- Language: English
- Subject: Slavery and emancipation
- Published: American Anti-Slavery Society
- Publication place: United States

American Slavery as It Is: Testimony of a Thousand Witnesses is a book written by the American abolitionist Theodore Dwight Weld, his wife Angelina Grimké, and her sister Sarah Grimké, which was published in 1839.

A key figure in the abolitionist movement, Weld was a white New Englander. His wife, Angelina, and sister-in-law Sarah, were from a Southern slave-owning family; both women were active in the abolitionist and women's suffrage movements. Theodore purchased in bulk from a reading room at the New York Stock Exchange issues of newspapers being discarded, hundreds if not thousands of them. He took them home to Fort Lee, New Jersey, and there the two women analyzed them, in essence running a clipping service, arranging the clippings by topic: diet, clothing, housing, working conditions, and the like. As the book says in its introduction, the Southern newspapers give themselves, especially in advertisements for runaway slaves, evidence of mistreatment of the enslaved. The book invites those interested to call at the office of the publisher, the American Anti-Slavery Society, to verify its sources. The book also analyzes arguments defending slavery. It was very influential in the formative days of the abolitionist movement.

Harriet Beecher Stowe used American Slavery as It Is as the direct inspiration for her novel, Uncle Tom's Cabin, which also became very influential in the movement to end slavery. Stowe went so far as to reportedly sleep with the book "under her pillow at night." Within the first year of publication, the book had sold 100,000 copies; it served as a vital combination of testimony from those affected by slavery and advertisements published by slavers themselves. This method proved effective at gaining support for abolitionism, since slave-owners could not dispute their own words no matter how poorly it reflected on their character.

Other works inspired in part by American Slavery as It Is included William Goodell's The American Slave Code in Theory and Practice, and Charles Dickens' American Notes quotes whole ads from Weld and the Grimké sisters' book. As well, "The Grimké Sisters at Work on Theodore Dwight Weld's American Slavery as It Is (1838)" is a poem by Melissa Range, published in the September 30, 2019, issue of The Nation. Frederick Douglass quoted from the book when giving speeches, and said that "not a single fact or statement recorded therein has ever been called in question by a single slave holder."

A PBS miniseries, The Abolitionists, using material from the book, aired in 2013.

== See also ==
- Abolitionism in the United States
- Slavery in the United States
- Treatment of slaves in the United States
