= Charles Stuart (abolitionist) =

Bermudian-born abolitionist (1783–1865)

Captain Charles Stuart
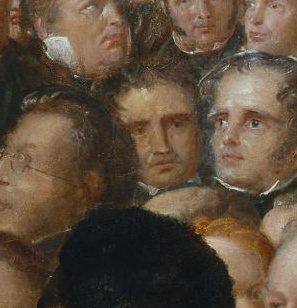
- Capt. Stuart between Thomas Scales (left) and Sir John Jeremie (right) shown in a detail from The Anti-Slavery Society Convention, 1840, by Benjamin Robert Haydon
- Born: 1783; Bermuda
- Died: 1865 (aged 81–82); Canada
- Education: Belfast
- Known for: Abolitionist

Captain Charles Stuart (1783 – 26 May 1865) was a Bermudian-born military officer and abolitionist. After leaving the military, he was a writer, primarily on slavery.

== Biography ==
Charles Stuart was born in 1783 in Bermuda, as shown by Canadian census records (countering assertions that he was born in Jamaica). His father was presumably a British army officer posted to the Bermuda Garrison, possibly Lieutenant Hugh Stewart of the detachment of invalid regular soldiers belonging to the Royal Garrison Battalion, which was disbanded in 1784, following the Treaty of Paris, probably resulting in Stuart's emigration from the colony; the surviving parish registries for the period, compiled by AC Hollis-Hallett as Early Bermuda Records, 1619-1826, list no birth of a Stuart, Stewart, or Steward in or about 1783 other than an unnamed child of Lieutenant Steward, baptised in St. George's on 8 December 1781.

Stuart was educated in Belfast and then pursued a military career as his first vocation.

Stuart is close to the centre in this painting which is of the 1840 Anti-Slavery Convention. Move your cursor to identify him or click icon to enlarge

He left the military in 1815 and, in 1817, emigrated to Upper Canada (Ontario) with a tidy pension. He settled in Amherstburg, Upper Canada, and began his pursuit of a cause both in Canada and England. By 1821, he was involved with the black refugees (fugitive slaves) who were beginning to arrive in the area from south of the border. He began a small black colony near Amherstburg, where he actively assisted the new arrivals to start new lives as farmers.

In 1822, Stuart took a position as the principal of Utica Academy in New York State. There he met the young Theodore Dwight Weld, who became one of the leaders of the American abolitionist movement during its formative years. By 1829, he returned to England for a time. There, Charles wrote some of the most influential anti-slavery pamphlets of the period.

In 1840, he attended the World Anti-Slavery Convention in June. One hundred and thirty of the more notable delegates were included in a large commemorative painting by Benjamin Haydon. This picture is now in the National Portrait Gallery in London.

He retired to a farm near Thornbury, Ontario, in 1850 at Lora Bay on Georgian Bay. Any product made from the use of slave labour was forbidden in his home.

== Writings ==
- The emigrant's guide to Upper Canada; or, sketches of the present state of that province, collected from a residence therein during the years 1817, 1818, 1819, interspersed with reflections (London, 1820)
- Is slavery defensible from Scripture? To the Rev. Dr. Hincks, Killileagh (Belfast, 1831)
- Remarks on the colony of Liberia and the American Colonization Society : with some account of the settlement of coloured people, at Wilberforce, Upper Canada (London, 1832)
- The West India question. Immediate emancipation would be safe for the masters;--profitable for the masters;--happy for the slaves;--right in the government;--advantageous to the nation;--would interfere with no feelings but such as are disgraceful and destructive;--cannot be postponed without continually increasing danger. An outline for immediate emancipation; and remarks on compensation (New Haven, Conn., 1833; originally London, 1832).
- Prejudice Vincible; or, The Practicability of Conquering Prejudice by Better Means than by Slavery and Exile; in relation to the American Colonization Society (New York, "Re-Printed from an English edition", 1833)
- The American colonization scheme further unravelled, undated, but reviewed at length in The Liberator of April 19, 1834.
- A memoir of Granville Sharp : to which is added Sharp's "Law of passive obedience," and an extract from his "Law of retribution" (New York: American Anti-Slavery Society, 1836; reprinted by The Negro Universities Press, a division of Greenwood Press, 1970, ISBN 0837146151)
- Stuart, Charles (1841). Oneida and Oberlin, or A Call, addressed to British Christians and philanthropists, affectionately inviting their sympathies, their prayers, and their assistance, in favour of the Christians and philanthropists of the United States of North America, for the extirpation, by our aid, of that slavery which we introduced into those states, while they were under our power. Bristol, England: Wright and Albright. JSTOR 60239226.
- A short history and description of the Ojibbeway Indians now on a visit to England : with correct likenesses, engraved from daguerreotype plates, taken by M. Claudet (London, 1844)
