= Sarah Moore Grimké =

American abolitionist (1792–1873)

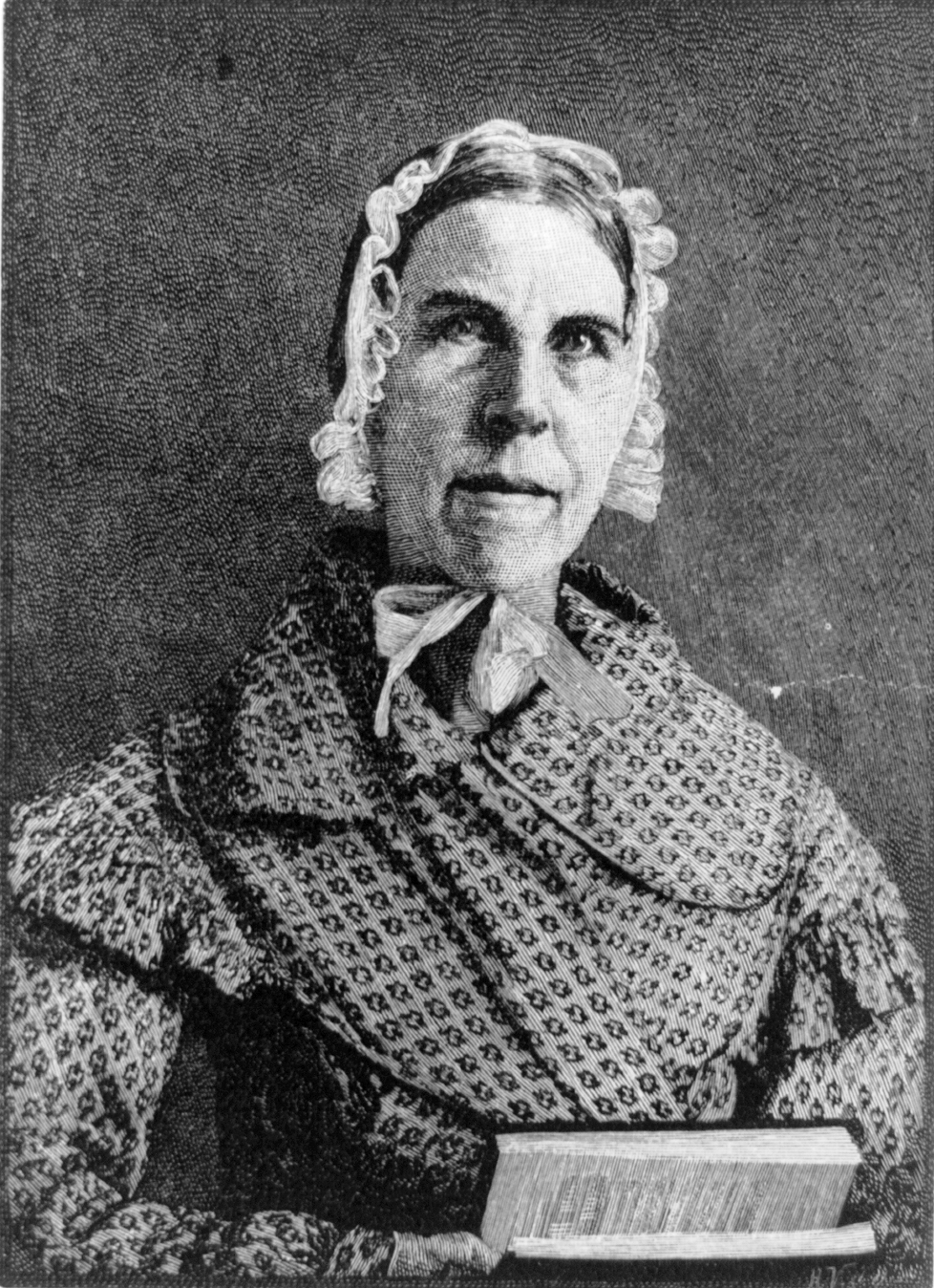
- Born: November 26, 1792; Charleston, South Carolina
- Died: December 23, 1873 (aged 81); Hyde Park, Massachusetts
- Occupations: Abolitionist, writer, feminist
- Relatives: John Faucheraud Grimké (father); Thomas Smith Grimké (brother); Angelina Grimké (sister)

Sarah Moore Grimké (November 26, 1792 – December 23, 1873) was an American abolitionist and feminist, widely held to be the mother of the women's suffrage movement. Born and reared in South Carolina to a prominent and wealthy planter family, she moved to Philadelphia, Pennsylvania, in the 1820s and became a Quaker, as did her younger sister Angelina. The sisters began to speak on the abolitionist lecture circuit, joining a tradition of women who had been speaking in public on political issues since colonial days, including Susanna Wright, Hannah Griffitts, Susan B. Anthony, Elizabeth Cady Stanton, and Anna Dickinson. They recounted their knowledge of slavery firsthand, urged abolition, and also became activists for women's rights.

== Early life ==
Sarah Grimké – her parents sometimes called her "Sally"– was born in South Carolina, the sixth of 14 children and the second daughter of Mary Smith and John Faucheraud Grimké. Their father was a rich planter and slave owner, an attorney and judge in South Carolina, and at one point Speaker of the South Carolina House of Representatives.

Sarah's early experiences with education shaped her future as an abolitionist and feminist. Throughout her childhood, she was keenly aware of the inferiority of her education when compared to her brothers' classical one. Although her family recognized her remarkable intelligence, she was prevented from obtaining a substantive education or pursuing her dream of becoming an attorney, as these goals were considered "unwomanly." She was educated by private tutors on subjects considered appropriate for a young Southern woman of her class, including French, embroidery, painting with watercolors, and playing the harpsichord. Her father allowed Sarah to study geography, history, and mathematics from the books in his library, and to read his law books; however, he drew the line at her learning Latin.

Sarah's mother Mary was a dedicated homemaker and an active member in the community. She was a leader of the Charleston's Ladies Benevolent Society. Mary was also an active Episcopalian and consequently often devoted herself to the poor and to women incarcerated in a nearby prison. Mary's beliefs were rigid.

Feeling confined in her role, Sarah developed a connection to her family's slaves to an extent that unsettled her parents. From the time she was 12 years old, Sarah spent her Sunday afternoons teaching Bible classes to the young slaves on the plantation, an experience she found frustrating. While she desperately wanted to teach them to read the Scripture for themselves, and they had a longing for such learning, her parents prohibited this, as teaching slaves to read was illegal in South Carolina. Her parents also said that literacy would only make the slaves unhappy and rebellious, making them unfit for manual labor. Teaching slaves to read had been prohibited since 1740 in South Carolina.

Sarah secretly taught Hetty, her personal enslaved girl, to read and write, but when her parents discovered the young tutor at work, the vehemence of her father's response proved alarming. He was furious and nearly had the young slave girl whipped. Fear of causing trouble for the slaves themselves prevented Sarah from undertaking such a task again. Years afterward, she reflected on the incident, writing "I took an almost malicious satisfaction in teaching my little waiting maid at night, when she was supposed to be occupied in combing and brushing my locks. The light was put out, the keyhole screened, and flat on our stomachs before the fire, with the spelling book under our eyes, we defied the laws of South Carolina."

Sarah's brother Thomas went to Yale Law School in 1805. During his visits home, Thomas continued teaching Sarah new ideas about the dangers of Enlightenment and the importance of religion. (Thomas died young, and was described in an obituary as most proud of his piety.) These ideas, combined with her secret studies of the law, gave her some of the basis for her later work as an activist. Her father told her that if she had been a man, she would have been the greatest lawyer in South Carolina. Lerner gives a somewhat different version, in which her father said "she would have made the greatest jurist in the country." Sarah believed her inability to get higher education was unfair. She wondered at the behavior of her family and neighbors, who encouraged slaves to be baptized and to attend worship services, but did not consider them true brothers and sisters in faith.

From her youth, Sarah believed that religion should take a more proactive role in improving the lives of those who suffered most. Her religious quest took her first to Presbyterianism; she converted in 1817. After moving to Philadelphia in 1821, she joined the Quakers, whom she had learned about in an earlier visit with her father. There, she became an outspoken advocate for education and suffrage for African Americans and women.

== Becoming an abolitionist ==
In 1817 Sarah's father was seriously ill, and the doctors of Charleston recommended he travel to Philadelphia to consult Dr. Philip Syng Physick. Despite her vehement objections, her father insisted that Sarah, then 26 years old, accompany him as his nursemaid. Sarah relented, and they left Charleston for the north in May, 1819. When Physick found he could not help, he suggested that they take in the sea air of the fishing village of Long Branch, New Jersey. The pair settled into a boardinghouse, where, after just a few weeks, John Faucheraud Grimké died.

As a result of this experience, Sarah became more self-assured, independent, and morally responsible. She decided she would not make her home in South Carolina:

As I left my native state on account of slavery, and deserted the home of my fathers to escape the sound of the lash and the shriek of tortured victims, I would gladly bury in oblivion the recollection of those scenes with which I have been familiar. But this cannot be. They come over my memory like gory spectres, and implore me, with resistless power, in the name of a God of mercy, in the name of a crucified Saviour, in the name of humanity, for the sake of the slaveholder as well as the slave, to bear witness to the horrors of the Southern prison-house.

She stayed in Philadelphia a few months after her father died and met Israel Morris, who would introduce her to Quakerism, specifically the writings of John Woolman. She returned to Charleston but decided that she would go back to Philadelphia to become a Quaker minister and leave her Episcopalian upbringing behind. She was stymied, however, when she was repeatedly ignored and shut out by the male-dominated Quaker council. Becoming alienated, she later wrote, "I think no criminal under sentence of death can look more fearfully to the day of execution than I do towards our Yearly Meeting."

She returned to Charleston in the spring of 1827 to "save" her sister Angelina from the limitations of the South. Angelina visited Sarah in Philadelphia from July to November of the same year and returned to Charleston committed to the Quaker faith. After leaving Charleston, Angelina and Sarah traveled around New England speaking on the abolitionist circuit, at first addressing women only in large parlors and small churches. Their speeches concerning abolition and women's rights reached thousands. In November, 1829, Angelina joined her sister in Philadelphia. They had long had a close relationship; for years, Angelina called Sarah "mother", as Sarah was both her godmother and primary caretaker.

In 1868, Sarah discovered that her late brother had three illegitimate mixed-race sons by a "personal" enslaved woman. Welcoming them into the family, Sarah worked to provide funds to educate Archibald Grimké and Francis James Grimké, who went on to successful careers and marriages, and were leaders in the African-American community. John, the youngest, was not interested in formal education and returned to the South to live.

== Activism and legacy ==
Sarah and Angelina had come to loathe slavery and all its degradations. They had hoped that their new faith would be more accepting of their abolitionist beliefs than their former had been. However, their initial attempts to attack slavery caused them difficulties in the Quaker community. The sisters persisted despite their belief that the fight for women's rights was as important as the fight to abolish slavery. Although Sarah had the desire to 'equip women for economic independence and for social usefulness' [22], they continued to be attacked, even by some abolitionists, who considered their position extreme. In 1836, Sarah published An Epistle to the Clergy of the Southern States. In 1837, Letters on the Equality of the Sexes and the Condition of Women was published serially in a Massachusetts newspaper, The Spectator, and immediately reprinted in The Liberator, the newspaper published by radical abolitionist and women's rights leader William Lloyd Garrison. The letters were published in book form in 1838.

When the sisters were together in Philadelphia, they devoted themselves to charity work and to the Society of Friends (the proper name for the religion often called "Quaker"). Sarah began working toward becoming a clergy member but was continually discouraged by male members of the church. Sarah realized that, though the church was something she agreed with in theory, it was not delivering on its promises. It was around this time that anti-slavery rhetoric began entering public discourse.

Joining her sister in the American Anti-Slavery Society in 1836, Sarah originally felt that she had found the place where she truly belonged, in which her thoughts and ideas were encouraged. However, as she and Angelina began speaking not only on abolition but also on the importance of women's rights, they began to face much criticism. Their public speeches were seen as unwomanly because they spoke to mixed-gender audiences, called "promiscuous audiences" at the time. They also publicly debated men who disagreed with them. This was too much for the general public of 1837 and caused many harsh attacks on their womanhood; one line of thought suggested that they were both just poor "spinsters" displaying themselves in order to find any man who would be willing to take one.

In 1838, Angelina married Theodore Weld, a leading abolitionist who had been a severe critic of their inclusion of women's rights into the abolition movement. She retired to the background of the movement while being a wife and mother, though not immediately. Sarah completely ceased to speak publicly. Apparently Weld had recently written her a letter detailing her inadequacies in speaking. He tried to explain that he wrote this out of love for her, but said that she was damaging the cause, not helping it, unlike her sister. However, as Sarah received many requests to speak over the following years (as did Angelina), it is questionable whether her "inadequacies" were as bad as he described.

During the Civil War, Sarah wrote and lectured in support of President Abraham Lincoln.

Sarah Moore Grimké was the author of the first developed public argument for women's equality. She worked to rid the United States of slavery, Christian churches which had become "unchristian," and prejudice against African Americans and women.

Her writings gave suffrage workers such as Lucy Stone, Elizabeth Cady Stanton and Lucretia Mott several arguments and ideas that they would need to help end slavery and begin the women's suffrage movement.

Sarah Grimké is categorized as not only an abolitionist but also a feminist because she challenged the Society of Friends, which touted women's inclusion but denied her. It was through her abolitionist pursuits that she became more sensitive to the restrictions on women. She so opposed being subject to men that she refused to marry. Both Sarah and Angelina became very involved in the anti-slavery movement and published volumes of literature and letters on the topic. When they became well known, they began lecturing around the country on the issue. At the time women did not speak in public meetings, so Sarah was viewed as a leader in feminist issues. She openly challenged women's domestic roles.

The papers of the Grimké family are in the South Carolina Historical Society, Charleston, South Carolina. The Weld–Grimké papers are in the William L. Clements Library, University of Michigan, Ann Arbor, Michigan. Papers of Sarah Grimké are held by the University of Texas Library, Austin, Texas. The Library of Congress holds 5 letters from her to Sarah Mapps Douglass.

The first volume of History of Woman Suffrage, published in 1881, is inscribed to the memory of the Grimké sisters, among others.

In 1998, the Grimké sisters were inducted into the National Women's Hall of Fame.

In November 2019, the city of Boston named a newly reconstructed bridge over the Neponset River in the Hyde Park neighborhood the Grimké Sisters Bridge. The Grimké sisters are remembered on the Boston Women's Heritage Trail.

== Views on faith and creation ==
Sarah Grimké's view on abolition is clear based on her activism, and she was a major female player in the abolition movement. These views were rooted in her Quaker faith, and she believed, similar to her sister, that slavery was contrary to God's will. Similarly, her views on women's rights were rooted in her interpretation of the Bible. She had strong opinions especially on the story of creation. She believed Adam and Eve were created equally, unlike many who believed Eve was created as a gift for Adam. She also assigns much of the blame for the fall to Adam, who was tempted by an equal, instead of Eve, who was tempted by a supernatural evil, which is more forgivable given her innocence. This was a main argument in Grimké's letter titled "The Original Equality of Woman," which describes her view of the equality of the sexes, discussed further in other letters.

Sarah Grimké used Scripture in most of her writings that demonstrated her dedication to the Quaker faith and her genuine belief in its compatibility with activism. In 1837 Sarah responded to a Pastoral Letter that reinforced Biblical interpretations supporting the role of females in the "private sphere" only, using Scripture to provide the benefits and power of this position. Sarah responded to this letter also with Scripture, encouraging women to take on a motto of 'The Lord is my light, and my salvation; whom shall I fear? The Lord is the strength of my life; of whom shall I be afraid?' She must feel, if she feels rightly, that she is filling one of the most important duties laid upon her as an accountable being, and that her character, instead of being 'unnatural', is in exact accordance with the will of Him,". Her faith and closeness to God were a critical factor in her ability to be unafraid during times of opposition and to argue on behalf of women and slaves well.

== Writings ==
Sarah composed a series of letters regarding women and their place in society, specifically within the church, that were later compiled in to a book titled Letters on the Equality of Sexes and the Condition of Women. It is in these letters that she discusses the wrongs done to women that are inconsistent with the Bible and gives advice on how women ought to combat these issues. This book was published in 1838, but her writings and letters, as well as her sister's, had been circulating for years due to the publications of their writings in The Liberator by William Lloyd Garrison.

In her first letter, dated January 11, 1837, she states that she relies solely on Scripture because she believes "almost everything that has been written on this subject [women's sphere], has been the result of a misconception of simple truths revealed in the Scriptures" outlining a clear intent and purpose for the analysis that follows. It is in these letters that she condemns the behavior of American men's treatment of women and slaves simply as a means to promote and benefit themselves. Letters 5-8 are dedicated to the evaluation of the condition of women in different countries, including Asia, Africa, Greenland, and the US, revealing the depth and breadth of her interest in women's issues stretched. Later, she declares that men are equally guilty in "the fall" (of Adam and Eve in the Bible) of humankind and therefore disproving the eternal punishment previously laid upon women as a result of their alleged irresponsibility. In the conclusion of her letters she acknowledges the striking ideas they pose and the newness to these discussions among Christians, but urges them to "investigate them fearlessly and prayerfully, and not shrink from the examination," which was characteristic of her writing and speeches.

=== Links to writings ===
- An epistle to the clergy of the southern states. New York. 1836.
- Letters on the equality of the sexes, and the condition of woman : addressed to Mary S. Parker. Boston: Isaac Knapp. 1838.

== In popular culture ==
- In 1973, Ruth Bader Ginsburg quoted Sarah Grimké as saying "I ask for no favor for my sex. All I ask of our brethren is that they take their feet off our necks," when Ginsburg gave her first oral arguments to the Supreme Court in Frontiero v. Richardson; this was also said by an actress playing Ginsburg in the film RBG (2018).
- The Grimké sisters and Theodore Dwight Weld are featured prominently in the juvenile fiction book The Forge and the Forest (1975) by Betty Underwood.
- The Grimké sisters appear as main characters in Ain Gordon's 2013 play If She Stood, commissioned by the Painted Bride Art Center in Philadelphia.
- Sue Monk Kidd's 2014 novel The Invention of Wings is based on Sarah Grimké's life.
- "The Grimké Sisters at Work on Theodore Dwight Weld's American Slavery As It Is (1838)" is a poem by Melissa Range, published in the September 30, 2019, issue of The Nation.

== See also ==
- Grimké sisters
- List of suffragists and suffragettes
- History of feminism
- Timeline of women's suffrage
