= National Enquirer (1836) =

Abolitionist newspaper founded by Quaker Benjamin Lundy in 1836

- Publisher: Benjamin Lundy
- Political alignment: abolitionist
- City: Philadelphia, PA
- ISSN: 2690-1102
- OCLC number: 12591808

The National Enquirer was an abolitionist newspaper founded by Quaker Benjamin Lundy in 1836, sponsored by the Pennsylvania Anti-Slavery Society. It was renamed the Pennsylvania Freeman after John Greenleaf Whittier took over as editor in 1838. Initial offices were at 223 Arch Street. It was to have been moved to the new abolitionist building, Pennsylvania Hall, but had not yet been when that building was destroyed by arson in May 1838.
