= Theodore Dwight Weld =

American abolitionist (1803–1895)

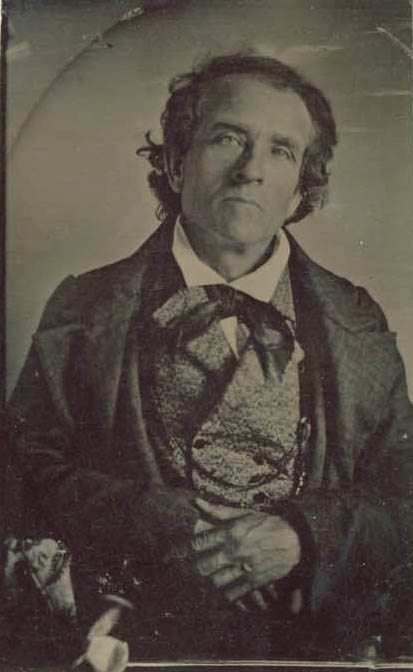
- Born: November 23, 1803; Hampton, Connecticut, US
- Died: February 3, 1895 (aged 91); Hyde Park, Massachusetts, US
- Education: Oneida Institute
- Occupations: Abolitionist, writer, teacher
- Employer(s): Society for Promoting Manual Labor in Literary Institutions (Lewis and Arthur Tappan), American Anti-Slavery Society
- Known for: One of Charles Grandison Finney's "Holy Band"; leader of Lane Rebels
- Notable work: American Slavery as It Is
- Spouse: Angelina Grimké (m. 1838; died 1879)
- Children: 3

Theodore Dwight Weld (November 23, 1803 – February 3, 1895) was one of the architects of the American abolitionist movement during its formative years from 1830 to 1844, playing a role as writer, editor, speaker, and organizer. He is best known for his co-authorship of the authoritative compendium American Slavery as It Is: Testimony of a Thousand Witnesses, published in 1839. Harriet Beecher Stowe partly based Uncle Tom’s Cabin on Weld's text; the latter is regarded as second only to the former in its influence on the antislavery movement. Weld remained dedicated to the abolitionist movement until slavery was ended by the Thirteenth Amendment to the United States Constitution in 1865.

According to Lyman Beecher, the father of Harriet Beecher Stowe, Weld was "as eloquent as an angel, and as powerful as thunder." His words were "logic on fire".

In 1950, Weld was described as being "totally unknown to most Americans".

His obscurity was of his own choosing. Weld would never accept an office of authority or honor in any antislavery organization. He refused to speak at antislavery conventions or anniversaries, or even to attend them if he could avoid it. He shunned the cities, and chose to labor in the country districts, where newspapers were few, and his activities were seldom reported except by abolition journals. His writings were published anonymously, and he would seldom allow the content of his speeches or his letters from the field to appear in print at all.

== Early life ==
Weld was born in Hampton, Connecticut, the son and grandson of Congregational ministers. He was descended from Thomas Welde, one of the original trustees of Harvard College. His mother owned slaves. At age 14 Weld took over his father's hundred-acre (forty-hectare) farm near Hartford, Connecticut, to earn money to study at Phillips Academy in Andover, Massachusetts, attending from 1820 to 1822, when failing eyesight caused him to leave. After a doctor urged him to travel, he started an itinerant lecture series on mnemonics, traveling for three years throughout the United States, including the South, where he saw slavery first-hand. In 1825 Weld moved with his family to Fabius, in upstate New York. At the time of the Weld-Grimké marriage they were living in Manlius, New York.

== College education ==
Weld then (1825) attended classes at Hamilton College in Clinton, Oneida County, New York, though he did not enroll as a student and does not appear in the College's published lists of students. About 1825 he stayed at the College in the suite of tutor William Kirkland, and not only attended classes but was "something of a leader among the students". The famous evangelist Charles Grandison Finney was based in Oneida County, and according to him, Weld "held a very prominent place among the students of Hamilton College, and had a very great influence." He described himself as "educated at Hamilton College." However, Hamilton turned down his proposal of a manual labor program.

While a student Weld attended some of Finney's many revivals, for he became Finney's disciple. In Utica, intellectual capital of western New York, center of abolitionism, and county seat of Oneida County, he met and became a good friend of Charles Stuart, an early abolitionist, who at that time (1822–1829) was head of the Utica Academy. They spent several years as members of Finney's "holy band".

In the winter of 1827, he and his brother Charles worked on a whaling vessel in Labrador.

Later in 1827, abandoning Hamilton on Stuart's recommendation, he enrolled in the new Oneida Institute of Science and Industry in nearby Whitesboro, New York, the most abolitionist school in the country, his fees paid for him by Stuart, after first participating in a pilot program, staying at the farmhouse of founder George Washington Gale in Western, New York, working in exchange for instruction. While at the Oneida Institute, where he was in charge of the cow-milking operation, he would spend two weeks at a time traveling about, lecturing on the virtues of manual labor, temperance, and moral reform. "Weld...had both the stamina and charisma to hold listeners spellbound for three hours." As a result, by 1831 he had become a "well known citizen" of Oneida County, according to a letter of Joseph Swan published in the Utica Elucidator.

Weld was described thus by James Fairchild, who knew him from when they were students together at Oberlin (of which Fairchild would later be President):

Among these students was Theodore D. Weld, a young man of surpassing eloquence and logical powers, and of a personal influence even more fascinating than his eloquence. I state the impression which I had of him as a boy, and it may seem extravagant, but I have seen crowds of bearded men held spell-bound by his power for hours together, and for twenty evenings in succession.

In an editorial comment in The Liberator, presumably by its editor Garrison, "Weld is destined to be one of the great men not of America merely, but of the world. His mind is full of strength, proportion, beauty, and majesty. ...[In his writing] there is indubitable evidence of intellectual grandeur and moral power."

In his reminiscences of that period Dr. Beecher observed:

Weld was a genius. ...In the estimation of the class, he was president. He took the lead of the whole institution. The young men had, many of them, been under his care, and they thought he was a god. We never quarreled, however.

In a completely different forum, William Garrison said that in a convention of antislavery "agents", who travelled from town to town giving abolitionist lectures and setting up new local anti-slavery societies, "Weld was the central luminary around which they all revolved".

His future wife Angelina Grimké said in 1836, when she first laid eyes on him and heard him speak for two hours on "What is slavery?", that "I never heard so grand & beautiful an exposition of the dignity & nobility of man in my life".

== Manual labor and education agent ==
His reputation as a speaker had reached New York, and in 1831, at the age of 28, Weld was called there by the philanthropists Lewis and Arthur Tappan. He declined their offer of a ministerial position, saying he felt himself unprepared. Since he was "a living, breathing, and eloquently-speaking exhibit of the results of manual-labor-with-study," the brothers then created, so as to employ Weld, the Society for Promoting Manual Labor in Literary Institutions [non-religious schools], which promptly hired him as its "general agent" and sent him on a factfinding and speaking tour. (The Society never carried out any activities except hiring Weld, hosting some of his lectures, and publishing his report.)

Weld carried out this commission during the calendar year 1832. His 100-page report on his activities, accompanied by 20 pages of letters received, is dated January 10, 1833. It received a review of 21 pages in the Quarterly Christian Spectator, and an abridgement was soon published.

In it he states that "In prosecuting the business of my agency, I have traveled during the year four thousand five hundred and seventy-five miles [7,364 km]; in public conveyances [boat and stagecoach], 2,630 [4,230 km]; on horseback, 1,800 [2,900 km]; on foot, 145 [233 km]. I have made two hundred and thirty-six public addresses." He was nearly killed when a high river swept away the coach he was in.

Weld had also been commissioned to find a site for a great national manual labor institution where training for the western ministry could be provided for poor but earnest young men who had dedicated their lives to the home missionary cause in the "vast valley of the Mississippi." Such an institution would undoubtedly attract many of Weld's associates who had been disappointed in the failure to establish theological instruction at the Oneida Institute. Cincinnati was the logical location. Cincinnati was the focal center of population and commerce in the Ohio valley.

During his year as a manual labor agent, Weld scouted land, found the location for, and recruited the faculty for the Lane Seminary, in Cincinnati. He enrolled there as a student in 1833, although he was informally the head, to the point of telling the trustees whom to hire. He had this power because on his recommendation the Tappans' subventions would continue, or go elsewhere (as they soon did, to Oberlin).

== Abolitionist ==
Some of his travel was in slave states. What he saw there, together with what he read in Garrison's newspaper The Liberator (1831) and book Thoughts on African Colonization (1832), turned him into a committed abolitionist. He first worked, in 1833, at convincing the other students at Lane that immediatism, ending slavery completely and immediately, was the only solution and what God wanted. Successful, he next, with the Tappans' collaboration, sought to bring immediatism to a larger audience. He announced that the public was invited to a series of public debates, over 18 evenings in February 1834, on abolition versus colonization. In fact, the debates were not debates at all, as no one spoke in favor of colonization. They were instead presentations of the horrors of American slavery, together with an exposé of the inadequacy of the American Colonization Society's project of helping free black people migrate to Africa and its intent to protect, rather than eliminate, slavery. At the end, the audience's views were highly supportive of immediate abolition.

The debates were then local events. However, during the Seminary's summer vacation of 1834, some of the students started teaching classes for, and in other ways working to help, the 1500 free African Americans of Cincinnati, with whom the students mixed freely. Given the pro-slavery sentiment in Cincinnati, many found his behavior unacceptable. After rumored threats of violence against the Seminary, the trustees passed rules abolishing the seminary's colonization and abolition societies and forbidding any further discussion of slavery, even at mealtimes. Weld was threatened with expulsion. A professor was fired. What happened was the mass resignation of almost all of Lane's student body, along with a sympathetic trustee, Asa Mahan. Later known as the Lane Rebels, they enrolled at the new Oberlin Collegiate Institute, insisting as conditions of their enrollment that they be free to discuss any topic (academic freedom), that Oberlin admit blacks on the same basis as whites, and that the trustees not be able to fire faculty for any or no reason. The fired professor was hired by Oberlin, and Mahan became its first president. Weld declined an appointment at Oberlin as professor of theology, saying abolitionism was a higher priority; he directed Shipperd to Charles Finney. Instead, he took a position as agent of the American Anti-Slavery Society for Ohio. "He has, with characteristic disinterestedness, accepted this agency at one half the salary he was offered by another institution."

=== Anti-slavery activity ===
Starting in 1834, Weld was an agent for the American Anti-Slavery Society, recruiting and training people to work for the cause, making converts of James G. Birney, Harriet Beecher Stowe, and Henry Ward Beecher. Weld became one of the leaders of the antislavery movement, working with the Tappan brothers, New York philanthropists James G. Birney and Gamaliel Bailey, and the Grimké sisters. "Public awareness of abolition [in New York State] reached its peak with the activities of Theodore Weld from February to early July, 1836."

In 1836, Weld discontinued lecturing when he lost his voice, and was appointed editor of its books and pamphlets by the American Anti-Slavery Society. Among the books he edited was James Thome and J. Horace Kimball's Emancipation in the West Indies : a six months' tour in Antigua, Barbadoes, and Jamaica, in the year 1837.

In 1838, Weld married Angelina Grimké. He was a strong abolitionist and women's rights advocate; at the marriage there were two ministers, one white and one black. He renounced any power or legal authority over his wife, other than that produced by love. Two former slaves of the Grimkés' father were among the guests. Weld and Grimké would go on to have three children: Charles, Theodore, and Sarah.

Their first home as newlyweds was in Fort Lee, New Jersey, where he, his wife, and her sister researched and co-wrote the very influential 1839 book American Slavery as It Is: Testimony of a Thousand Witnesses. Angelina's unmarried older sister Sarah (Angelina's godmother) resided with them for many years. In 1840, they moved to a farm in Belleville, New Jersey, where Weld ran a school.

Weld also publicly opposed the practice of medical experimentation on African Americans, writing about its cruelty in his 1839 work "American Slavery as It Is."

In June 1840, the World Anti-Slavery Convention in London denied seats to Lucretia Mott and other women, mobilizing them to fight for women's rights. This led to a split in the U.S. abolitionist movement between the nonviolent (but wanting it immediately) "moral suasion" of William Lloyd Garrison and his American Anti-Slavery Society, which linked abolition with women's rights, and Weld, the Tappan brothers, and other "pragmatic" (gradualist) abolitionists, who formed the American and Foreign Anti-Slavery Society (AFASS) and entered politics through the anti-slavery Liberty Party (ancestor of the Free-Soil Party and Republican Party), founded by James Birney, their U.S. presidential candidate in 1840 and 1844, who also founded the National Anti-Slavery Society. In 1841–43, Weld relocated to Washington, D.C., to direct the national campaign for sending antislavery petitions to Congress. He assisted John Quincy Adams when Congress tried him for reading petitions in violation of the gag rule, which stated that slavery could not be discussed in Congress.

=== Schools ===
In early 1853, Weld was offered the position of Director of a school of the Raritan Bay Union at Eagleswood in Perth Amboy, New Jersey. The school accepted students of all races and sexes. In 1862, the school having closed, they moved to Perth Amboy. In 1864 they moved to Hyde Park, Massachusetts, where Weld helped open another school, this one in Lexington, Massachusetts, dedicated to the same principles. Here, Weld had "charge of Conversation, Composition, and English Literature", and Angelina taught history. The school burned in 1867, and the Welds were then in retirement.

== Family ==
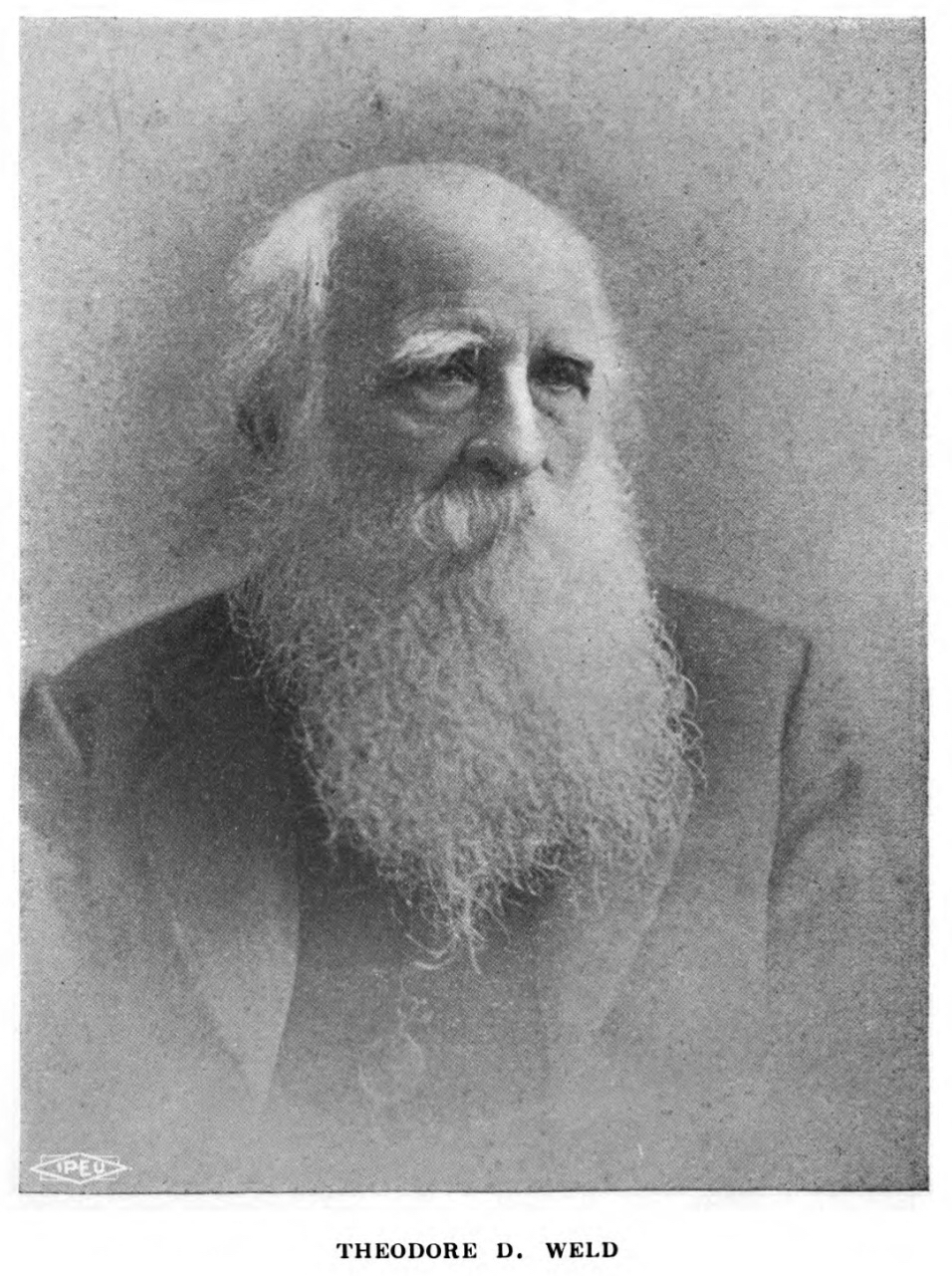
Undated portrait of Theodore D. Weld as an old man

Weld was the son of Ludovicus Weld and Elizabeth (Clark) Weld. His brother Ezra Greenleaf Weld, a famous daguerreotype photographer, was also involved with the abolitionist movement (see Fugitive Slave Convention).

A member of the Weld family of New England, Weld shares a common ancestry with Bill Weld, Tuesday Weld, and others. This branch of the family never achieved the wealth of their Boston-based kin.

Weld died at his home in Hyde Park, Massachusetts, aged 91, on February 3, 1895.

== Writings ==
- Weld, Theodore D. (1833). First annual report of the Society for Promoting Manual Labor in Literary Institutions, including the report of their general agent, Theodore D. Weld. January 28, 1833. New York: S. W. Benedict & Co.
- Weld, Theodore D. (June 14, 1834). "Discussion at Lane Seminary [letter to James Hall]". The Liberator. p. 1 – via newspapers.com.
- Weld, Theodore D. (1837). "5". The Bible Against Slavery. An inquiry into the Patriarchal and Mosaic systems on the subject of Human Rights (3rd, revised ed.). New York: American Anti-slavery Society. Weld received a published reply.
- Weld, Theodore D. (1838). The Power of Congress over the District of Columbia. New York.
- American Slavery as It Is: Testimony of a Thousand Witnesses (with the Grimké sisters; 1839)
- Weld, Theodore D. (1840). Persons held to service, fugitive slaves, &c. Boston: New England Anti-Slavery Tract Association. Archived from the original on October 26, 2020. An excerpt, "Slavery a System of Inherent Cruelty", appeared on pp. 127–140 of the Boston, 1850, edition of the Narrative of Sojourner Truth : a northern slave, emancipated from bodily servitude by the state of New York, in 1828 : with a portrait.
- [Weld, Theodore D.] (1841). Slavery and the internal slave trade in the United States of North America; being replies to questions transmitted by the committee of the British and Foreign Anti-slavery Society, for the abolition of slavery and the slave trade throughout the world. Presented to the General Anti-slavery Convention, held in London, June 1840. London: British and Foreign Anti-slavery Society.
- Weld, Theodore D. (1885). In Memory: Angelina Grimké Weld. Boston.

== Archival material ==
Papers of Weld and the Grimké sisters are at the Clements Library, University of Michigan, Ann Arbor, Michigan.

Additional letters were published in the two-volume set Letters of Theodore Dwight Weld, Angelina Grimké Weld and Sarah Grimké 1822-1844, published by Appleton with funding of the American Historical Association/Albert J. Beveridge Memorial Fund.

The original letters were held at the time of publication by Dr. L.D.H. Weld, Smith Collection at Syracuse University, Garrison collection at the Boston Public Library, Oberlin College, the Archaeological and Historical Society of Ohio, and in the James Gillespie Birney and Weld collections at the Library of Congress

== Legacy ==
- Another Lane Rebel, Huntington Lyman, named his son Theodore Weld Lyman (born 1840) for Weld.
- In 2009 Weld was inducted into the National Abolition Hall of Fame, in Peterboro, New York.

== See also ==
- Fugitive Slave Convention
