= William B. Purvis =

African-American inventor

- Born: August 12, 1838; Philadelphia, Pennsylvania, U.S.
- Died: August 10, 1914 (aged 75); Philadelphia, Pennsylvania, U.S.
- Known for: Inventions
- Parents: Joseph Purvis (father); Sarah Louisa Forten Purvis (mother)
- Relatives: James Forten (grandfather), Charlotte Vandine Forten (grandmother), Robert Purvis (uncle), Margaretta Forten (aunt), Harriet Forten Purvis (aunt)

William B. Purvis (12 August 1838 – 10 August 1914) was an African-American inventor and businessman who received multiple patents in the late 19th-century. His inventions included improvements on paper bags, an updated fountain pen design, improvement to the hand stamp, and a close-conduit electric railway system.

== Life ==
William B. Purvis was born in Philadelphia, Pennsylvania, into a wealthy and influential family, one of the eight children of Joseph Purvis, a gentleman farmer and Sarah Louisa Forten Purvis, noted poet. William's maternal grandfather was African-American sailmaker, merchant, philanthropist, inventor, civil rights agitator and Abolitionist James Forten; his uncle was Robert Purvis, wealthy businessman, abolitionist and landowner; his aunts included educator Margaretta Forten and essayist and poet Harriet Forten Purvis; cousins included Dr. Charles Burleigh Purvis of Freedmen's Hospital in Washington, D. C., suffragist and author Harriet Purvis, Jr., and educator, poet and essayist Charlotte Forten Grimke.

William Purvis lived with his family on his father's farm in Bucks County, Pennsylvania until the latter's death in 1857 and the family subsequently moved to Philadelphia, where they boarded with relatives. Purvis, who appears to have inherited his grandfather's mechanical inclinations, worked on various inventions, attempting to raise funding from various sources, including his wealthy uncle Robert Purvis.

== Major inventions ==
=== Improvement to the hand stamp ===
Purvis's first patent, on February 27, 1883, was an improvement of the hand stamp that enabled it to replenish its own ink.

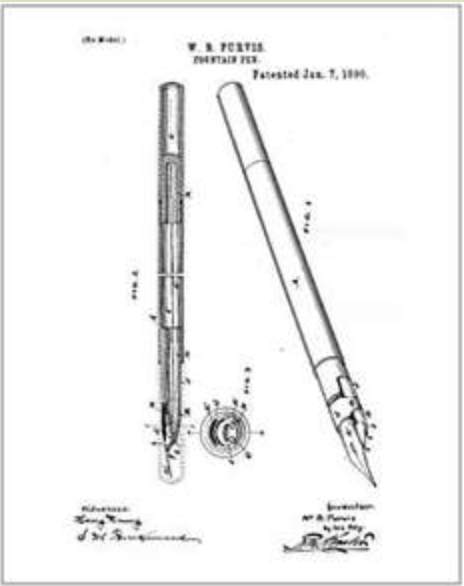

=== Fountain pen ===
According to Purvis, his updated design of the fountain pen was intended to provide a simple, durable, and cheaper construction so the pen could be carried in someone's pocket. Purvis set an elastic tube between the pen nib and the ink reservoir, enabling the tube to return the excess ink to the reservoir. After this improvement, the new pen could evenly distribute the ink when being used. For this design, Purvis received U.S. Patent 419,065 on January 7, 1890.

=== Paper bags ===
Purvis had a particular interest in paper bags, and continually attempted to improve upon the bag-making process. From 1884 to 1897, he was granted at least six different patents for paper bag technology. In August 1890 Purvis was issued a patent for an improved paper bag machine manufactured satchel bottom shopping bags at an improved volume with greater automation than any previous machinery. His paper shopping bag machine utilized a combination of two suction formers that had perforated surfaces. The ends of the paper tube were fed between these surfaces and provided with two independent grooves arranged at different positions along the length of the [former]s (something that gives shape to the bag) and out of line with each other. In 1883, Purvis established the Sterling Paper Bag Company, but it went bankrupt and was shut down in 1894. While his uncle was able to settle the company's debts William managed to sell some of his patents to the Eastern Paper Bag Company in Connecticut and the Union Bag Company of New York.

=== Close-conduit electric railway system ===
First installed in New Jersey, Purvis's close-conduit electric railway system set an electromagnet under the center of the railcar. The closed conduit construction was made by insulating material, and installing many soft iron cables on its surface. The cable was attracted upwardly against the top of the space in which it lay, making contact with a brass strip. According to Dr. John MacFadyen, the superintendent of the Installation, the new system was safer and cheaper than the old system, and he believed the new system would replace the old one in the near future.

Purvis was able to earn some profit from this invention; with a number of investors, he formed the Union Electric Construction Company, dedicated to the development of urban railway systems using his patents, and for a time was the President of the concern. By 1899 the company had offices in the Philadelphia Bourse and pursued opportunities in a number of cities including Omaha, Nebraska, Jersey City, New Jersey, Des Moines, Iowa and Washington, D. C.

=== Last years ===
William Purvis, who never married, and his sister Harriet Anne "Annie" Purvis moved from their home at 3045 Fontaine Street in North Philadelphia to a new home at 216 Sharon Avenue in Sharon Hill, Pennsylvania, located in Darby Township, Delaware County, Pennsylvania around 1905.

In January 1914, he wrote the lyrics for a song entitled "I'm Going Back Home Once More," with music by one Francis M. Myers. The song was published by the music publishing firm of C. L. Partee and Co. of New York City and submitted for copyright to the Library of Congress the following April.

William B. Purvis died two days before his seventy-sixth birthday, on August 10, 1914, at the old Medico-Chi Hospital in Philadelphia. He was buried in the churchyard of the Church of Saint James the Less in the East Falls section of Philadelphia several days later. His grave is unmarked.

== See also ==
- Railway electrification system
