= List of African-American abolitionists =

See also Category:African-American abolitionists

== A ==
- William G. Allen (c. 1820 – 1 May 1888)
- Osborne Perry Anderson

== B ==
- Henry Walton Bibb
- Mary E. Bibb
- James Bradley
- Henry Box Brown
- William Wells Brown

== C ==
- John Anthony Copeland Jr.
- Ellen and William Craft
- Paul Cuffe (January 17, 1759 – September 7, 1817)

== D ==
- Thomas Dalton
- Martin Delany
- Moses Dickson
- Charles Remond Douglass
- Frederick Douglass (c. February 1817 – February 20, 1895)
- Sarah Mapps Douglass
- Thomas Downing
- David Walker (abolitionist)

== F ==
- James Forten
- Margaretta Forten

== G ==
- Eliza Ann Gardner
- Henry Highland Garnet
- Mifflin Wistar Gibbs
- Rev. Samuel Green
- Shields Green
- Charlotte Forten Grimké

== H ==
- Frances Harper
- Lewis Hayden
- Felix Holbrook

== J ==
- Harriet Jacobs
- John S. Jacobs
- Thomas James

== L ==
- Charles Henry Langston
- John Mercer Langston
- Lewis Sheridan Leary
- Jermain Wesley Loguen
- Mary Sampson Patterson Leary Langston

== M ==
- Mary Meachum
- Henry Moxley
- Anna Murray-Douglass

== N ==
- William Cooper Nell
- Dangerfield Newby

== P ==
- John Parker
- Susan Paul
- James W.C. Pennington
- Gabriel Prosser
- Harriet Forten Purvis
- Robert Purvis

== R ==
- Peter Randolph
- Charles Bennett Ray
- Charlotte B. Ray
- Charles L. Reason
- Hetty Reckless
- Charles Lenox Remond
- John Swett Rock
- David Ruggles
- John Brown Russwurm (October 1, 1799 – June 9, 1851)

== S ==
- Dred Scott (c. 1799 – September 17, 1858)
- Benjamin "Pap" Singleton
- James McCune Smith
- Lucy Stanton
- Austin Steward (1793 – February 15, 1869)
- Maria W. Stewart
- William Still

== T ==
- Sojourner Truth (c. 1797 – November 26, 1883)
- Harriet Tubman (c. March 1822 – March 10, 1913)
- Nat Turner (October 2, 1800 – November 11, 1831)

== V ==
- George Boyer Vashon
- Denmark Vesey (c.1767 – July 2, 1822)

== W ==
- David Walker (September 28, 1796 – August 6, 1830)
- William Whipper (February 22, 1804 – March 9, 1876)
- Theodore S. Wright (1797–1847)

== See also ==
- Abolitionism in the United States
- Category:African-American abolitionists
- John Brown's raiders#Black participation
- List of notable opponents of slavery
- Slavery in the United States
- Texas Revolution
- Underground Railroad
- United States Colored Troops
