= Charlotte Forten Grimké =

American anti-slavery activist, poet and educator (1837–1914)

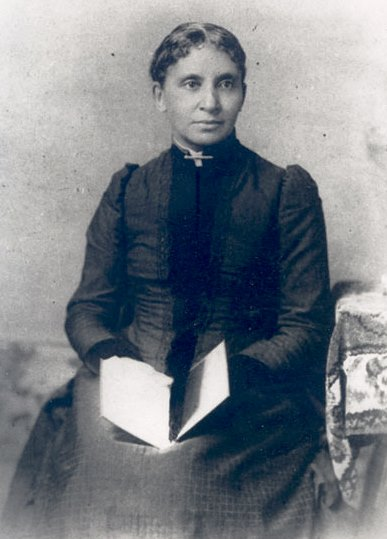
- Born: Charlotte Louise Bridges Forten; August 17, 1837; Philadelphia, Pennsylvania, U.S.
- Died: July 23, 1914 (aged 76)
- Education: Salem Normal School For Teachers
- Spouse: Francis James Grimké (m. 1878)
- Parent(s): Robert Bridges Forten; Mary Virginia Wood
- Relatives: Margaretta Forten (paternal aunt); Harriet Forten Purvis (paternal aunt); James Forten, Sr. (paternal grandfather); Samuel Johnston (maternal great-grandfather)

Charlotte Louise Bridges Grimké (née Forten; August 17, 1837 – July 23, 1914) was an African-American abolitionist, poet, and educator. She grew up in a prominent abolitionist family in Philadelphia. She taught school for years, including to freedmen in South Carolina during the Civil War. Later in life, she married Francis James Grimké, a Presbyterian minister who led a major church in Washington, DC, for decades. He was a nephew of the abolitionist Grimké sisters and was active in civil rights.

Her diaries written before the end of the Civil War have been published in numerous editions in the 20th century and are significant as a rare record of the life of a free Black woman in the antebellum North.

== Early life and education ==
Forten, known as "Lottie," was born on August 17, 1837, in Philadelphia, Pennsylvania, to Mary Virginia Wood (1815–1840) and Robert Bridges Forten (1813–1864).

=== Paternal family lineage ===
Her father, Robert Forten, was the son of equal rights activist James Forten. Robert Forten and his brother-in-law, Robert Purvis, abolitionists and members of the Philadelphia Vigilance Committee, offered assistance to people who escaped slavery. Her paternal grandfather, the wealthy sailmaker James Forten Sr., was an early abolitionist in Philadelphia.

Her paternal aunts – Margaretta Forten, Sarah Louisa Forten Purvis, and Harriet Forten Purvis – and her paternal grandmother, Charlotte Vandine Forten, were all founding members of the Philadelphia Female Anti-Slavery Society.

=== Maternal family lineage ===
While the Fortens were free northern Blacks, Charlotte's mother, Mary Virginia Wood, had been born into slavery in the south. She was the daughter of wealthy planter James Cathcart Johnston of Hayes Plantation, Edenton, North Carolina, and the granddaughter of Governor Samuel Johnston of North Carolina. In 1832, James Cathcart Johnston anonymously emancipated Mary, who was 17 years old, along with her mother and sisters, with the help of a Quaker businessman in Baltimore.

Charlotte's maternal grandmother, Edith "Edy" Wood (1795–1846) was enslaved by Captain James Wood, owner of the Eagle Inn and Tavern in Hertford, Perquimans County, North Carolina. Edy Wood and the wealthy planter James Cathcart Johnston had four daughters: Mary Virginia, Caroline (1827–1836), Louisa (1828–1836), and Annie E. (1831–1879).

Johnston emancipated Edy and their children in 1832 and settled them in Philadelphia in 1833 where they rented a Pine Street home for two years from Sarah Allen, widow of Richard Allen of Philadelphia's Mother Bethel A.M.E. Church. From 1835 through 1836, Edy Wood and her children boarded with Elizabeth Willson, mother of Joseph Willson, author of Sketches of Black Upper Class Life in Antebellum Philadelphia.

=== Family life ===
After Charlotte's mother, Mary Virginia Wood married Robert B. Forten in 1836, her grandmother Edy joined the Forten household and paid board to her son-in-law. When Mary died of tuberculosis in 1840, Edy continued to care for her grandchild Charlotte alongside her own daughter and Charlotte's young aunt, Annie Wood, who was only six years older. Upon Edy Wood's death in 1846, Charlotte was raised by various members of the Forten-Purvis family, including her aunt Harriet Forten Purvis, the wife of Robert Purvis, who led the Black reform community after James Forten's death. while her aunt Annie moved to the Cassey House, where she was adopted by Amy Matilda Cassey.

=== Education ===
In 1854, at the age of 16, Charlotte Forten joined the household of Amy Matilda Cassey and her second husband, Charles Lenox Remond, in Salem, Massachusetts, so that she could attend the Higginson Grammar School, a private academy for young women. She was the only non-white student in a class of 200. The school offered classes in history, geography, drawing, and cartography, with special emphasis placed on critical thinking skills. After Higginson, Forten studied literature and education at the Salem Normal School, which trained teachers. Forten cited William Shakespeare, John Milton, Margaret Fuller and William Wordsworth as some of her favorite authors. Her first teaching position was at Eppes Grammar School in Salem, becoming the first African American hired to teach white students in a Salem public school.

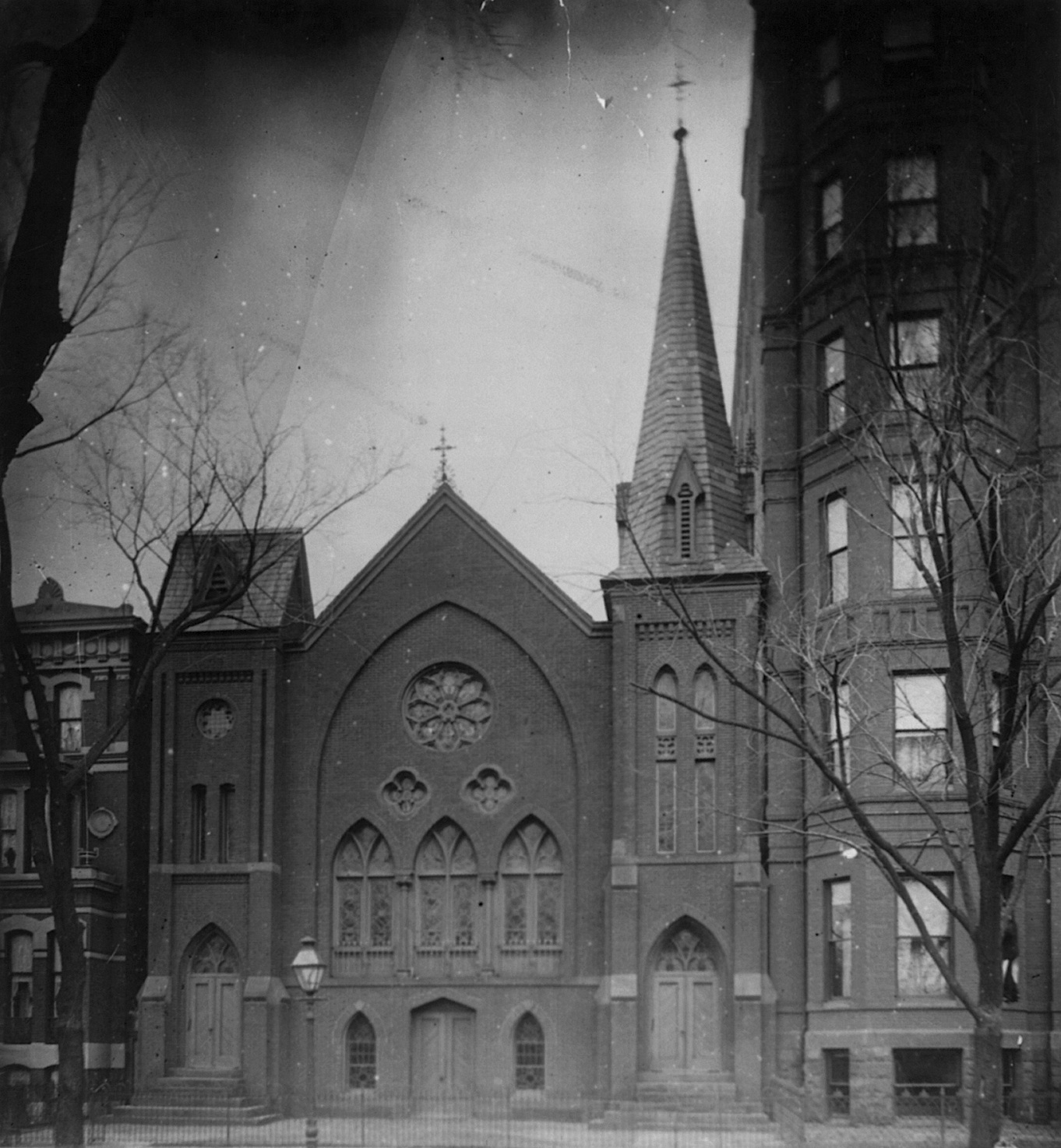
Grimké assisted with her husband's ministry at Fifteenth Street Presbyterian Church in Washington, DC, shown here as it was in about 1899.

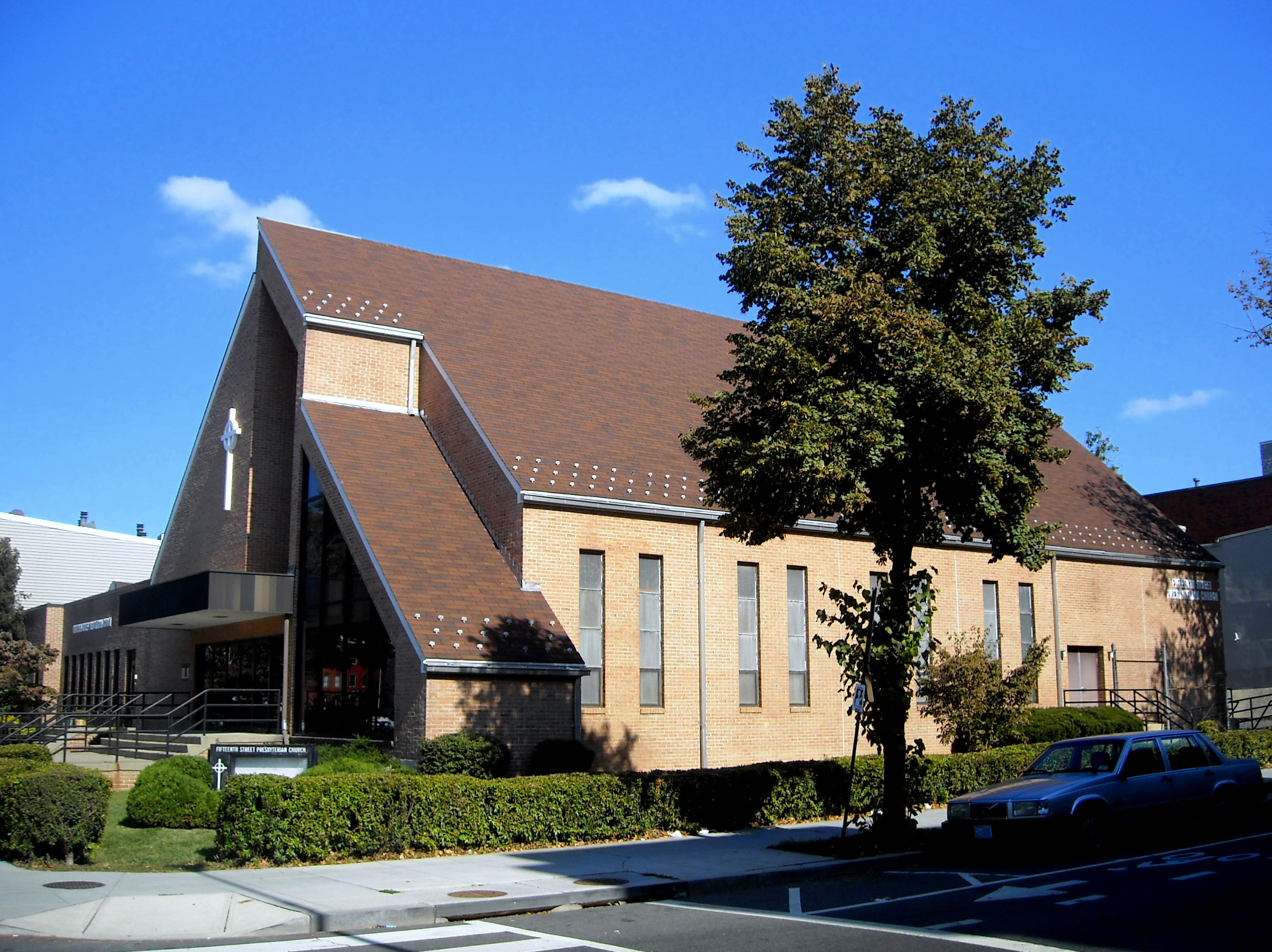
The Fifteenth Street Presbyterian Church today

== Activism ==
Forten became a member of the Salem Female Anti-Slavery Society, where she was involved in coalition building and fund-raising. She proved to be influential as an activist and leader on civil rights. Her grandmother Charlotte Vandine Forten and her aunts had established themselves as part of the Black female leadership in Philadelphia and had been founding members of the biracial Philadelphia Female Anti-Slavery Society, founded in 1833.

Forten occasionally spoke to public groups on abolitionist issues. In addition, she arranged for lectures by prominent speakers and writers, including Ralph Waldo Emerson and Senator Charles Sumner. Forten was acquainted with many other anti-slavery proponents, including William Lloyd Garrison, editor of The Liberator, and the orators and activists Wendell Phillips, Maria Weston Chapman and William Wells Brown.

In 1892, Forten, Helen Appo Cook, Ida B. Wells, Anna Julia Cooper, Mary Jane Patterson, Mary Church Terrell, and Evelyn Shaw formed the Colored Women's League in Washington, D.C. The goals of the service-oriented club were to promote unity, social progress, and the best interests of the African-American community. In 1896, Forten co-founded the National Association of Colored Women which made many contributions to education, health, social services and political activism. Forten stayed active in activist circles until her death.

== Teaching career ==
In 1856, finances forced Forten to take a teaching position at Epes Grammar School in Salem. She was well received as a teacher but returned to Philadelphia after two years due to tuberculosis. At this point, Forten began writing poetry, much of which was had activist themes. Her poetry was published in The Liberator and Anglo African magazines.

During the American Civil War, Forten was the first Black teacher to join the mission to the South Carolina Sea Islands known as the Port Royal Experiment. She taught the children of slaves abandoned by the white owners who fled Union troops after the battle of Port Royal in November 1861. The Union allowed Northerners to set up schools to begin teaching freedmen who remained on the islands, which had been devoted to large plantations for cotton and rice.

Forten was the first African American to teach at the Penn School (now the Penn Center) on St. Helena's Island, South Carolina. The school was initially founded to teach enslaved African-American children and eventually African-American children freed during the U.S. Civil War. The Union forces divided the land, giving freedmen families plots to work independently. Forten worked with many freedmen and their children on St. Helena Island. During this time, she resided at Seaside Plantation. She chronicled this time in her essays, entitled "Life on the Sea Islands", which were published in Atlantic Monthly in the May and June issues of 1864.

Forten struck up a deep friendship with Robert Gould Shaw, the Commander of the all- Black 54th Massachusetts Regiment during the Sea Islands Campaign. She was present when the 54th stormed Fort Wagner on the night of July 18, 1863. Shaw was killed in the battle, and Forten volunteered as a nurse to the surviving members of the 54th.

Following the war in the late 1860s, she taught in Boston, Massachusetts and Charleston, South Carolina. In 1872, Forten taught at a preparatory school in Washington, D.C. that later became known as Paul Laurence Dunbar High School. One year later, she became a clerk in the Treasury Department.

== Marriage and family ==
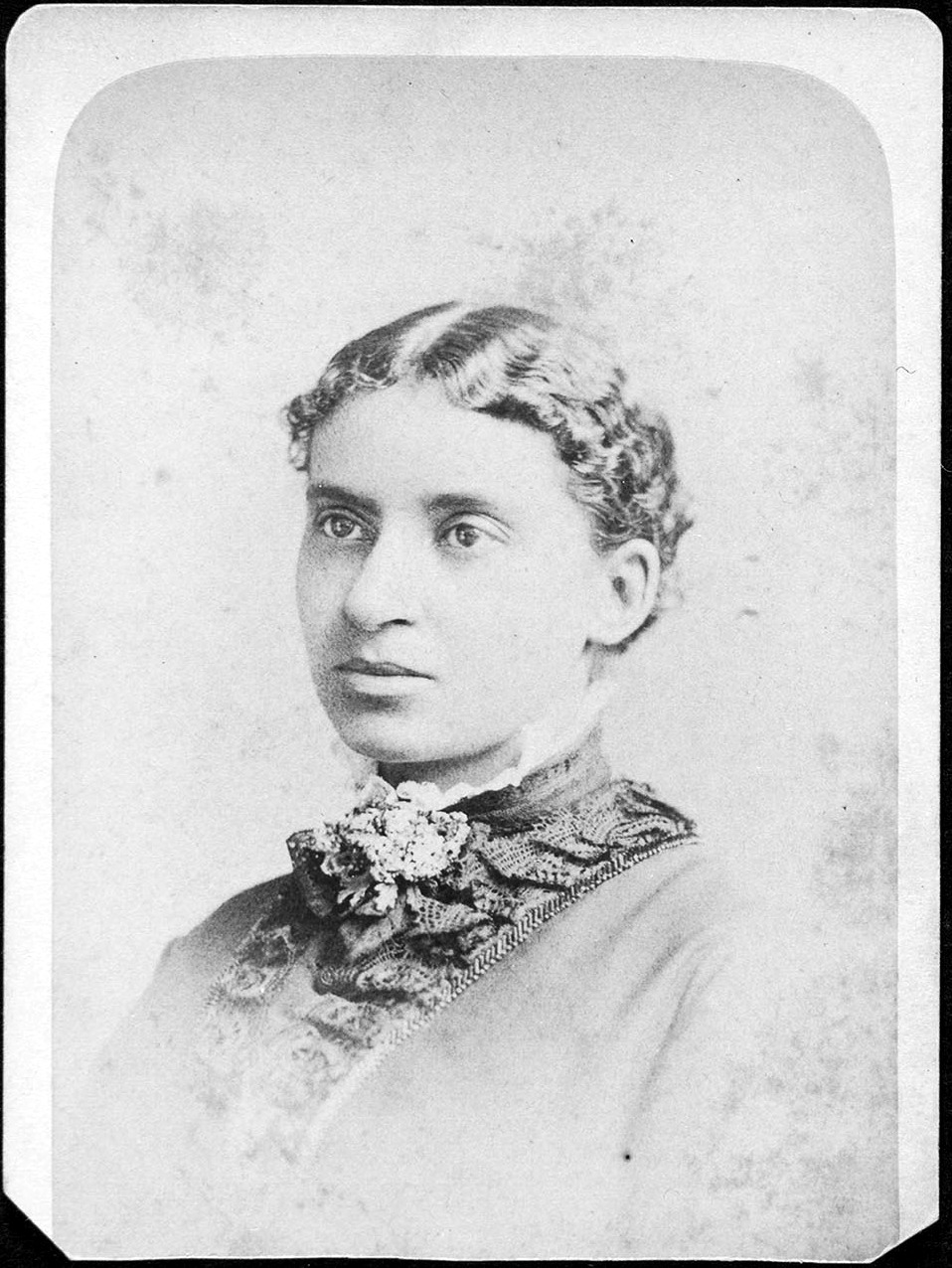
Charlotte L. Forten Grimké, 1870s

In December 1878, Forten married Presbyterian minister Francis J. Grimké, pastor of the prominent Fifteenth Street Presbyterian Church in Washington, D.C., a major African-American congregation. He was a mixed-race nephew of white abolitionists Sarah and Angelina Grimké of South Carolina. Francis and his brother Archibald Grimké were the sons of Henry Grimké and Nancy Weston (a woman of color). At the time of their marriage, Forten was 41 years old and Grimké was 28. On January 1, 1880, the couple's daughter Theodora Cornelia Grimké was born, but the child died less than five months later.

Charlotte Grimké assisted her husband in his ministry, helping create important networks in the community, including providing charity and education. Many church members were leaders in the African-American community in the capital. She organized a women's missionary group and focused on "racial uplift" efforts. When Francis's brother, Archibald Grimké, was appointed as U.S. consul in the Dominican Republic (1894–98), Francis and Charlotte cared for Archibald's daughter Angelina Weld Grimké, who lived with them in the capital. Angelina Grimké later became an author in her own right and was one of the first African-American women to have a play publicly performed.

Details of Charlotte Forten Grimké's health and travels during the 1880s and 1890s are documented in the recently discovered letters of Louisa Matilda Jacobs, Charlotte's third-cousin, and daughter of fugitive-slave-narrative author Harriet Ann Jacobs.

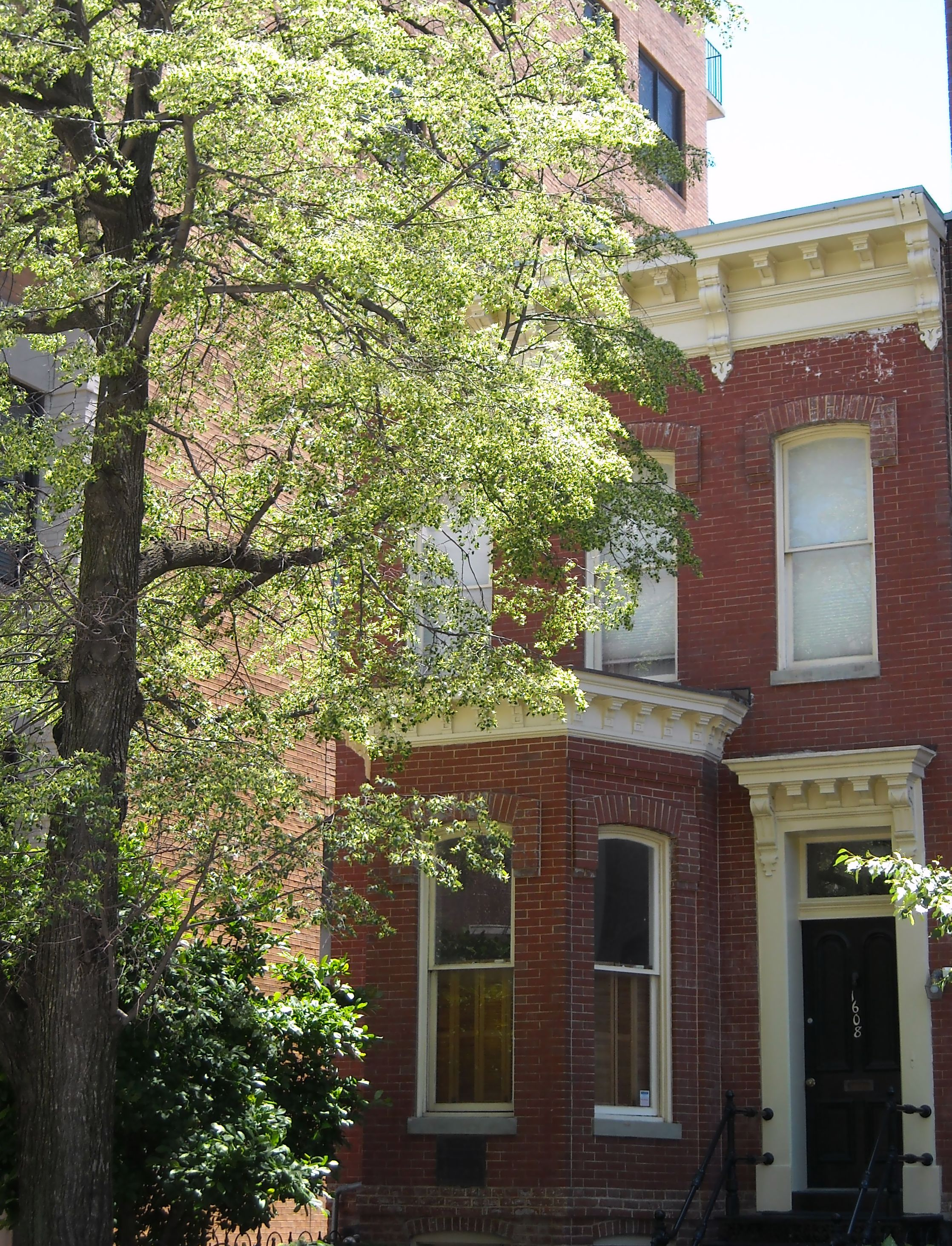
The Charlotte Forten Grimke House

Charlotte Forten Grimké died on July 23, 1914 after years of declining health and thirteen months bedridden.

The Charlotte Forten Grimke House in Washington, D.C., is listed on the National Register of Historic Places.

== Writings ==
In 1864, Charlotte left her teaching position in Port Royal, South Carolina and returned to Philadelphia where she began writing her experiences of the Port Royal experiment. Her essays, "Life on the Sea Islands, Part I and Part II" were published in Atlantic Monthly publication in 1894.

Charlotte Forten Grimké's last literary effort was in response to The Evangelist editorial, "Relations of Blacks and Whites: Is There a Color Line in New England?" It asserted that Blacks were not discriminated against in New England society. She responded that Black Americans achieved success over extraordinary social odds, and they simply wanted fair and respectful treatment.

She was a regular journal writer until she returned North after teaching in South Carolina. After her return, her entries were less frequent, although she wrote about her daughter's death and her busy life with her husband in Washington, D.C. Her journals are a rare example of documents detailing the life of a free Black female in the Antebellum North.

In her diary on December 14, 1862, she made a reference to "the blues" as a sad or depressed state of mind. She was teaching in South Carolina at the time and wrote that she came home from a church service "with the blues" because she "felt very lonesome and pitied myself." She soon got over her sadness and later noted certain songs, including one called Poor Rosy, that were popular among the slaves. Forten admitted that she could not describe the manner of singing but she did write that the songs "can't be sung without a full heart and a troubled spirit." Those conditions inspired countless blues songs and could be described as the essence of blues singing.

== See also ==
- List of abolitionists
- List of African-American abolitionists

== Bibliography ==
- Billington, Ray, ed., The Journal of Charlotte Forten: A Free Negro in the Slave Era, New York: Norton, 1981. ISBN 978-0-393-00046-7
- Randall, Willard Sterne and Nahra, Nancy. Forgotten Americans: Footnote Figures who Changed American History. Perseus Books Group, United States, 1998. ISBN 0-7382-0150-2
- Maillard, Mary (2013). ""Faithfully Drawn from Real Life" Autobiographical Elements in Frank J. Webb's The Garies and Their Friends". Pennsylvania Magazine of History and Biography. 137 (3): 261–300. doi:10.5215/pennmaghistbio.137.3.0261. JSTOR 10.5215/pennmaghistbio.137.3.0261.
- Maillard, Mary, ed. (May 9, 2017). Whispers of Cruel Wrongs: The Correspondence of Louisa Jacobs and Her Circle, 1879–1911. University of Wisconsin Press, 2017. ISBN 978-0-299-31180-3.
- Shockley, Ann Allen, Afro-American Women Writers 1746–1933: An Anthology and Critical Guide, New Haven, Connecticut: Meridian Books, 1989. ISBN 0-452-00981-2
- Stevenson, Brenda, ed., The Journals of Charlotte Forten, New York: Oxford Press, 1988. ISBN 978-0195052381
- Winch, Julie, A Gentleman of Color: The Life of James Forten, New York: Oxford University Press, 2002. ISBN 0-198-02476-2
