= Harriet Purvis =

Harriet Purvis may refer to:

- Harriet Forten Purvis (1810–1875), African-American abolitionist and suffragist
- Harriet Purvis Jr. (1839–1904), her daughter, African-American abolitionist, suffragist and member of the temperance movement
