= Charlotte Forten =

Charlotte Forten may refer to:

- Charlotte Forten Grimké (1837–1914), née Forten, African-American abolitionist, poet, and educator
- Charlotte Vandine Forten (1785–1884), American abolitionist
