= Harriet Purvis Jr. =

American abolitionist, suffragist and member of the temperance movement

- Born: c. 1839; U.S.
- Died: 1904 (aged 64–65); Watertown, Massachusetts, U.S.
- Other name: Hattie Purvis Jr.
- Education: Friends Eagleswood School, Raritan Bay Union
- Occupations: activist, abolitionist, suffragist
- Parents: Robert Purvis (father); Harriet Forten Purvis (mother)
- Relatives: Charles Burleigh Purvis (brother); Sarah Louisa Forten Purvis (aunt); Margaretta Forten (aunt)

Harriet Purvis Jr. also known as Hattie Purvis (c. 1839 – 1904) was an African-American abolitionist, suffragist and a member of the temperance movement. She was part of the second generation of American suffragists. Purvis worked closely with Susan B. Anthony.

== Biography ==
She was born in about 1839 to activists Harriet Forten Purvis and Robert Purvis. She was the granddaughter of James Forten. She grew up in a household that was center of the Pennsylvania's Underground Railroad. She attended school at Friends Eagleswood School and Theodore Dwight Weld's Raritan Bay Union school in Perth Amboy, New Jersey.

She was a member of the Philadelphia Female Anti-Slavery Society and worked to raise funds. She attended the 1866 National Woman's Rights Convention and became a member of the American Equal Rights Association (AERA). She served as secretary for AERA from 1866 until 1869. She was on the executive committee of the Pennsylvania Woman's Suffrage Association. She was a delegate and the first African-American president of the National Woman's Suffrage Association.

She died on April 4, 1904, in Watertown, Massachusetts.
