= Hetty Reckless =

Runaway slave

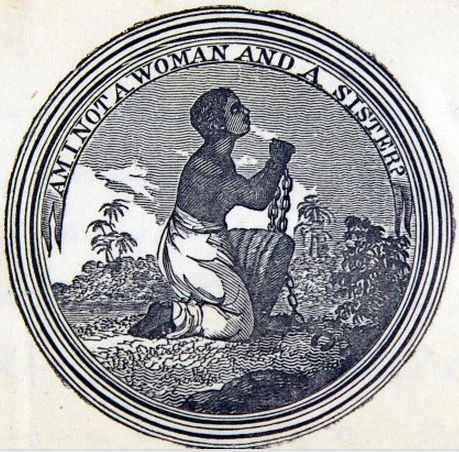
- "Am I not a woman and a sister?" – the seal of the Philadelphia Female Anti-Slavery Society, of which Reckless was a founder member.
- Born: Amy Hester Boadley; 1776; Salem, New Jersey
- Died: January 28, 1881; Philadelphia
- Organizations: Female Vigilant Association; Moral Reform Retreat; Philadelphia Female Anti-Slavery Society
- Known for: Campaigning against slavery and vice

Amy Hester "Hetty" Reckless (c. 1776–1881) was a person who liberated herself from slavery and became part of the American abolitionist movement. She campaigned against slavery and was part of the Underground Railroad, operating a Philadelphia safe house. She fought against prostitution and vice, working toward improving education and skills for the black community. Through efforts including operating a women's shelter, supporting Sunday Schools and attending conferences, she became a leader in the abolitionist community. After her former enslaver's death, she returned to New Jersey and continued working to assist escaping slaves throughout the Civil War.

== Early life in Salem ==
Amy Hester "Hetty" Reckless was born into slavery in Salem, New Jersey, in 1776, the daughter of Dorcas Boadley, who was enslaved by the wealthy Johnson family who lived in Johnson Hall. Initially, Reckless was considered the property of Jane Gibson Johnson and when she died became her son's chattel. When Colonel Robert Gibbon Johnson married for the second time, his wife Julianna mistreated Reckless. Fleeing to Philadelphia in 1826 (Note: Crew claims that the escape happened in 1826, which seems more probable than the claim of 1799 made by Pestana, as Johnson did not marry his second wife until 1813.) with her daughter, Reckless sought help from the Abolition Society claiming at first that she had been emancipated by her previous owner. She recounted that she boarded a stagecoach like any other passenger and rode without question from Salem to Philadelphia, resolved not to return because Johnson's wife had knocked out her front teeth with a broomstick and yanked out tufts of her hair. She also was aggrieved because Johnson's mother had promised her she would receive her freedom, but when the Colonel inherited Reckless, he refused. Colonel Johnson tried to reclaim her as his slave, promising to set her free if she would return and give him her daughter. Reckless refused and did not return to Salem until after Johnson's death in 1850.

== Philadelphia and the campaign against slavery ==
In Philadelphia, Reckless lived with Samuel and Eliza Clement, who were related to the Goodwins, the Quaker sisters who were pioneers of the Underground Railroad. Introduced to this circle, in 1833, Reckless became a founding member of the Philadelphia Female Anti-Slavery Society (PFASS), along with Grace Bustill Douglass, Sarah Mapps Douglass, and Charlotte Forten Grimké with her daughters. Reckless's past situated her to advocate for abolition within this PFASS. Her cherished possessions included a photograph of the members of the PFASS and a flag with anti-slavery inscriptions. The PFASS was a racially integrated organization, but Reckless also worked with the predominantly-black Female Vigilant Association, which formed in 1838. This group was an auxiliary of the male Vigilant Association of Philadelphia, to which Reckless was appointed a full member in 1843. Of the fifteen committee members appointed to replace the previous board, Reckless served with the male appointees. Reckless liaised between these organizations. September 1841 minutes of the PFASS show that Reckless reported that the Vigilance Committee had saved 35 enslaved people in a single month and recorded her request for additional funds of support. Four years later, she again requestedfunds to assist fugitive slaves.

Reckless also operated a safe house for the Underground Railroad on Rodman Street in Philadelphia. Her activities included supporting the establishment of Sabbath schools in the black community. Reckless felt it was important for the benevolent societies to support organizations which the African American community had created for themselves, but improve them with educational offerings. In 1838, Reckless attended the Anti-Slavery Convention of American Women, held in Philadelphia from 15 to 18 May. Reckless also participated in the "Convention of the Colored People" held in Philadelphia in 1840. Lucretia Mott attended this gathering, noting that African American women delegates participated as equals in the meeting.

== Moral Reform Retreat ==
Reckless was not only concerned with freeing women from slavery, but from sexual exploitation as well. In 1845, she and Hetty Burr co-founded the Moral Reform Retreat to shelter women "victims of vice". It was the only shelter for African American women in Philadelphia. The first two years the shelter was open, they housed over 200 women for periods of up to six months, providing shelter and education. The organization served the additional purpose of providing employment for the women who ran the shelter. Reckless introduced Sarah Mapps Douglass, who was from a more privileged class, to women's vulnerabilities to prostitution because of their illiteracy and lack of skills. Douglass was moved to invest funds in establishing the shelter and helped Reckless and Burr teach the women skills to broaden their economic alternatives.

== Return to Salem and death in Philadelphia ==
After 1850, Reckless returned to Salem and continued her anti-slavery work, living on Market Street, near the old Johnson manor house. These activities continued through the American Civil War, when in a letter from 1862 from Abigail Goodwin to William Still, Goodwin reported that "Amy Reckless" collected $17 (~$548.00 in 2025) (more than any other contributor) and was collecting clothing for fugitives.

By 1880, Reckless had returned to Philadelphia and was living with two of her daughters. She died at home on January 28, 1881. Her home was located at 1015 Rodman Street which is now in the Washington Square West district of central Philadelphia. She was aged almost 105 and left a daughter who was in her seventies. Her mind was quite sharp until the end and she was fond of recounting that she had seen George Washington more than once.
