= Charlotte Forten Grimké House =

Historic house in Washington, D.C., United States

- U.S. National Register of Historic Places
- U.S. National Historic Landmark
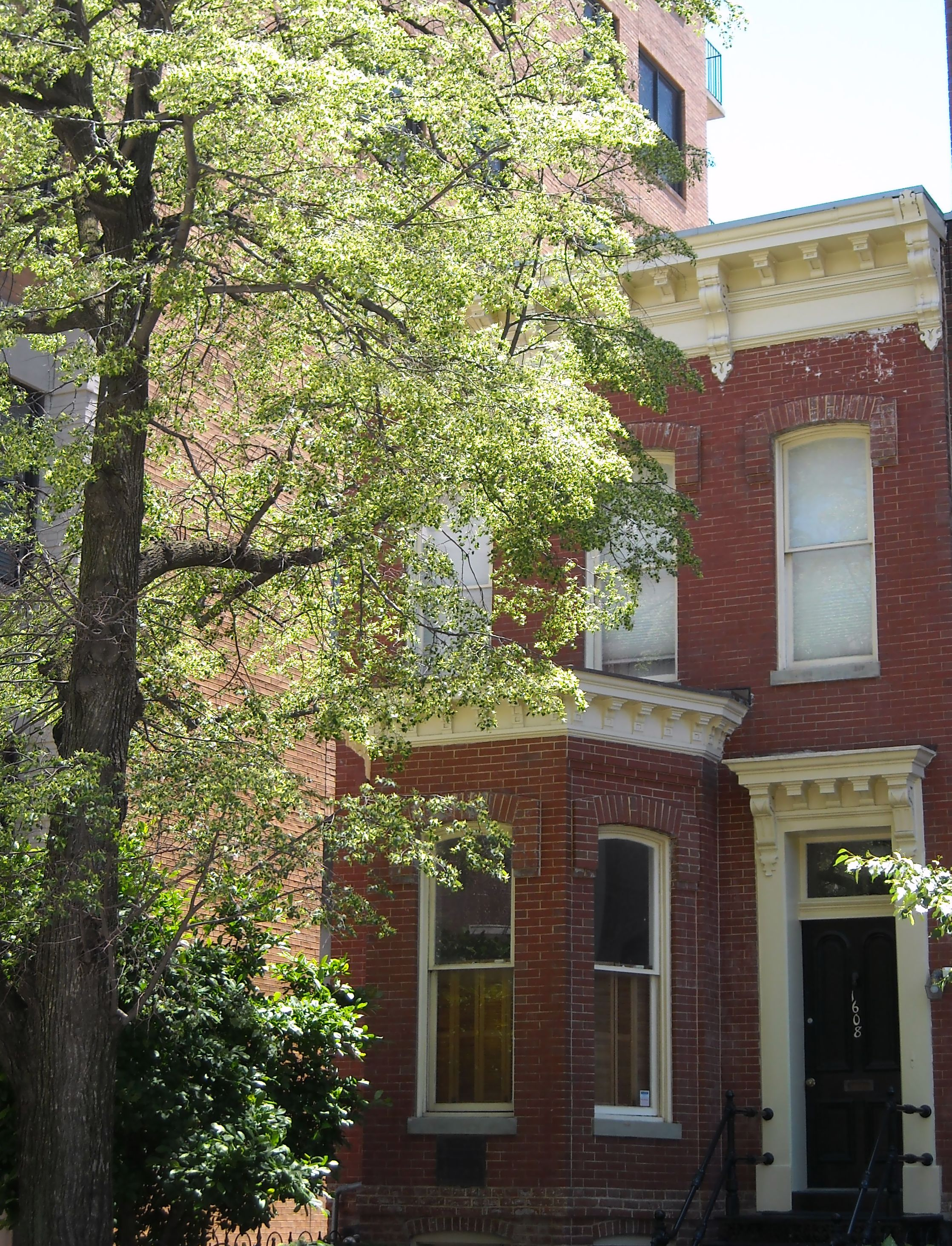

- Location within Washington, D.C.
- Location: 1608 R St., NW., Washington, D.C.
- Coordinates: 38°54′45″N 77°2′13″W
- Area: less than one acre
- NRHP reference No.: 76002129
- Added to NRHP: May 11, 1976

The Charlotte Forten Grimké House is a historic house at 1608 R Street NW in the Dupont Circle neighborhood of Northwest Washington, D.C., United States. From 1881 to 1886, the house was home to Charlotte Forten Grimké (1837–1914), an African-American abolitionist and educator, one of the first Northerners to enter Union-controlled areas of the South during the American Civil War in order to teach freedmen and their children. The house was designated a National Historic Landmark in 1976.

== Description and history ==
The Charlotte Forten Grimké House is located northeast of Dupont Circle, on the south side of R Street, roughly midway between 16th and 17th Streets. It is a two-story masonry row house, built out of red brick. It is two bays wide, with a single-story polygonal bay on the left and entrance on the right. The door is topped by a transom window framed by a bracketed hood. The bay, main roof line, and an entrance hood all have a heavy modillioned cornice. Windows on both levels are set in segmental-arch openings with soldier brick headers. The building's construction date is not known. It was home to Charlotte Forten Grimké and her husband, Rev. Francis Grimké, from 1881 to 1885.

Charlotte Forten was born to wealthy African Americans in Philadelphia in 1838, and was steeped in abolitionist activity from an early age. In 1855 she completed training at a normal school and became a teacher and abolitionist activist. She wrote articles for William Lloyd Garrison's Liberator, the leading anti-slavery publication of the day. During the American Civil War she was chosen to teach former slaves in the South, on the Sea Islands of South Carolina as part of the "Port Royal Experiment". Following the Civil War, she was known as a supporter of women's rights, including suffrage; and as a teacher and writer. In 1894 she was co-founder of the Colored Women's League. She published poetry expressing her activism before the war. Her journals, reprinted in the 1980s, are significant as works by a free black woman in the antebellum North.

In 1878 Forten married Francis Grimké, nephew to the activist Grimké sisters. The couple resided at this house from 1881 to 1885, when Francis was pastor at the 15th Street Presbyterian Church.

The house was added to the DC Inventory on March 3, 1979, and was also designated a National Historic Landmark and listed on the National Register of Historic Places on May 11, 1976

== See also ==
- List of National Historic Landmarks in the District of Columbia
- National Register of Historic Places listings in the upper NW Quadrant of Washington, D.C.
