= Seaside Plantation =

Historic house in South Carolina, United States

- U.S. National Register of Historic Places
- Location within South Carolina Location within the United States
- Location: 10 miles east of Beaufort on U.S. Route 21, near Beaufort, South Carolina
- Coordinates: 32°21′2″N 80°34′13″W
- Area: 3 acres (1.2 ha)
- Built: c. 1795-1810, 1862
- Architectural style: Georgian, Federal
- NRHP reference No.: 79002375
- Added to NRHP: July 16, 1979

Seaside Plantation, also known as the Edgar Fripp Plantation, is a historic plantation house located on Saint Helena Island near Beaufort, Beaufort County, South Carolina. It was built about 1795 to 1810, and is a two-story, frame dwelling in a transitional Georgian / Federal style. It features one-story hip roofed portico. Seaside was one of the plantations participating in the Port Royal Experiment and had as its labor superintendent Charles Pickard Ware (1840–1921). Charlotte Forten Grimké (1837-1914) also resided at Seaside Plantation. Along with Tombee Plantation, Seaside is one of only a few remaining antebellum plantation houses on St. Helena. Also on the property are the contributing original, brick-lined well, a clapboard shed, a large barn with clapboard siding and tin roof, and a round concrete and oyster shell silo.

It was listed in the National Register of Historic Places in 1979.
