= Robert Purvis =

American abolitionist

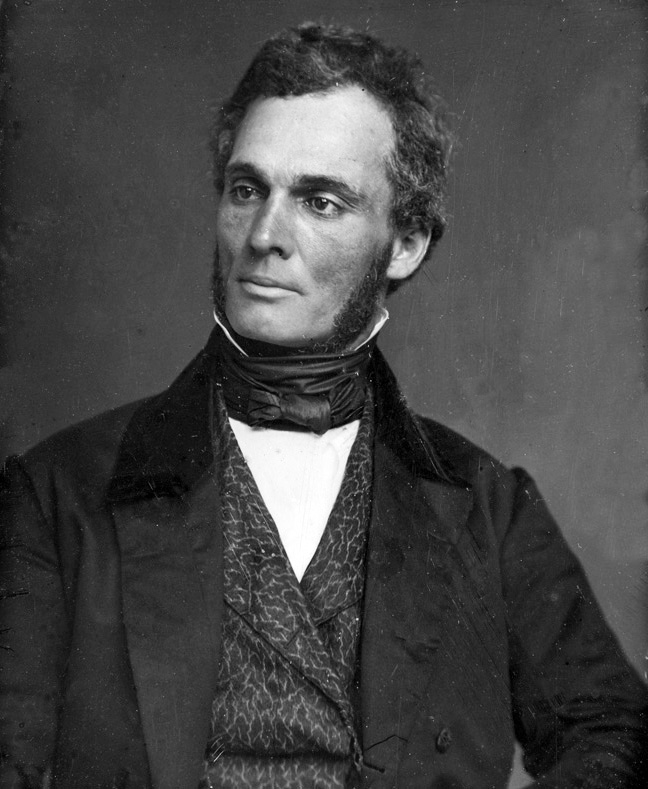
- Purvis c.1840–1849
- Born: August 4, 1810; Charleston, South Carolina
- Died: April 15, 1898 (aged 87); Philadelphia, Pennsylvania
- Known for: Abolitionist, Underground Railroad
- Spouse(s): Harriet Forten Purvis; Tacie Townsend
- Children: 8, including Harriet Purvis, Jr., Charles Burleigh Purvis

Robert Purvis (August 4, 1810 – April 15, 1898) was an American abolitionist in the United States. He was born in Charleston, South Carolina, and was likely educated at Amherst Academy, a secondary school in Amherst, Massachusetts. He spent most of his life in Philadelphia, Pennsylvania. In 1833, he helped found the American Anti-Slavery Society and the Library Company of Colored People. From 1845 to 1850, he served as president of the Pennsylvania Anti-Slavery Society and also traveled to Britain to gain support for the movement.

Of mixed race, Purvis and his brothers inherited considerable wealth from their native British father after his death in 1826. Purvis's parents had lived in a common law marriage, prevented from marrying because his mother was a mixed race free woman of color, of Sub-Saharan African and Jewish descent. The sons chose to identify with the black community and used their education and wealth to support abolition of slavery and anti-slavery activities, as well as projects in education to help the advance of African Americans.

== Early life ==
Purvis was born in 1810 in Charleston, South Carolina. His maternal grandparents were Dido Badaraka, a formerly enslaved woman, and Baron Judah, a Jewish American native of Charleston. His mother Harriet Judah was born a free woman of color. Purvis's father was an immigrant from Great Britain.

As an adult, Purvis told a reporter about his family. His maternal grandmother, Badaraka, was kidnapped at age 12 from Morocco where she was already enslaved. She was then transported to South Carolina on a slave ship, and sold as a slave in India. Described by Purvis as dark-skinned with tightly curled hair, she was most likely of Sub-Saharan African descent as evidenced by her name and her physical description. She was freed at age 19 by her master's will. Harriet's father was Baron Judah, born in Charleston of Ashkenazi and Sephardi Jewish descent. Baron was the third of ten children born to Hillel Judah, a Jewish immigrant from Germany, and Charleston native Abigail Seixas, his Spanish-Portuguese Jewish wife.

Purvis told the reporter that his grandparents Badaraka and Judah had married. This claim has been questioned by 21st-century biographers, given the social prominence of the Judah family in Charleston. Judah's parents owned slaves. In any case, Badaraka and Judah had a relationship for several years, and had two children together, Harriet and her brother. In 1790, Judah broke off his relationship with Badaraka when he moved with his parents from Charleston to Savannah, Georgia. In 1791 he moved to Richmond, Virginia. There he married a Jewish woman and had four children with her.

William Purvis was from Northumberland. His father died while he was a child, and his mother moved to Edinburgh for her sons' education. He immigrated to the United States as a young man with some of his brothers to make their fortunes. William became a wealthy cotton salesman in Charleston and was a naturalized United States citizen.

William Purvis and Harriet Judah lived together as husband and wife, but racial law prevented their marriage. The couple had three sons: William, born in 1806; Robert, born in 1810; and Joseph, born in 1812. In 1819 the family moved north to Philadelphia, Pennsylvania, where the boys attended the Pennsylvania Abolitionist Society's Clarkson School. William intended to consolidate his business affairs and return with his family to Britain, where he thought his sons would have better opportunities. He died in 1826 before they could move.

William Purvis had intended his sons to be educated as gentlemen, and Robert and Joseph Purvis likely attended Amherst Academy, a secondary school in Amherst, Massachusetts. There is no evidence that either Robert or Joseph Purvis attended Amherst College, a common misconception. (Amherst College catalogs from the 1820s do not list them as enrolled.) The brothers returned to Philadelphia, where their family was among the black elite. After their father died, Purvis and his two brothers were to share an estate worth $250,000. In 1828 the oldest brother William died of tuberculosis. Robert and Joseph inherited increased shares of the estate; they used their wealth to support their political activism and public service.

== Marriage and family ==
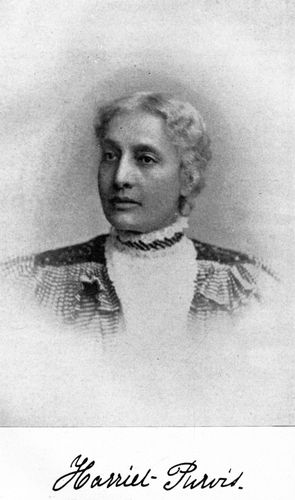
Harriet Forten Purvis (1810-1875), taken about 1874

In 1832, Purvis married Harriet Davy Forten, a woman of color and the daughter of wealthy sailmaker James Forten and his wife Charlotte, both prominent abolitionists and leaders in Philadelphia. Like her parents and siblings, Harriet Forten Purvis was active in anti-slavery groups in the city, including the interracial Philadelphia Female Anti-Slavery Society.

The Purvises had eight children, including son Charles Burleigh Purvis (1841-1926). He became a surgeon and professor for 30 years in the medical school at Howard University. In addition, the couple raised Harriet's niece, Charlotte Forten Grimké, after her mother died. In her later life, Harriet Forten Purvis lectured publicly against segregation and for expanded suffrage for all citizens.

After Harriet died, Purvis married Tacie Townsend, who was of European descent. She was from Byberry Township (now Northeast Philadelphia), where Purvis had moved after the 3-day riots threatened his safety. As a public figure, he was criticized for this marriage by both whites and blacks who cared about the color line.

== Political life ==
In 1833, Purvis helped abolitionist William Lloyd Garrison establish the American Anti-Slavery Society in Philadelphia and signed its "Declaration of Sentiments". Living for nearly the rest of the 19th century, Purvis was the last surviving member of the society. That same year, he helped establish the Library Company of Colored People, modeled after the Library Company of Philadelphia, a subscription organization. With Garrison's support, in 1834, Purvis traveled to Britain to meet leading abolitionists.

In 1838, he drafted the "Appeal of Forty Thousand Citizens Threatened with Disfranchisement", which urged the repeal of a new state constitutional amendment disfranchising free African Americans. There were widespread tensions and fears among whites following Nat Turner's slave rebellion of 1831 in Virginia. Although Pennsylvania was a free state that had abolished slavery, state legislators persisted in passing this amendment to restrict free blacks' political rights. Free men of color in Pennsylvania did not regain suffrage until after the ratification of the Fifteenth Amendment in 1870, following the Civil War.

From 1845 to 1850, Purvis served as president of the Pennsylvania Anti-Slavery Society, a biracial organization. As a supporter of the Underground Railroad, Purvis served as chairman of the General Vigilance Committee from 1852 to 1857, which gave direct aid to fugitive slaves. According to his records, Purvis estimated that from 1831 to 1861, he helped one slave per day achieve freedom, aiding a total of more than 9,000 slaves to escape to the North. He used his own house, then located outside the city, in Byberry Township, as a station on the Underground Railroad. One of these slaves was Madison Washington, whom Purvis harbored during his escape to Canada. Purvis built Byberry Hall on the edge of the Quaker-owned, Byberry Friends Meeting campus. Byberry Hall, which still stands today, hosted anti-slavery speakers and was across the street from Purvis's home. Among the enslaved Africans he assisted was Thomas J. Dorsey, who became one of three of the top caterers in Philadelphia in the 19th century. Purvis was a friend of both Thomas and his son William Henry Dorsey, who was an artist and collector of Black history. William compiled hundreds of scrapbooks of Black history during the 19th century and built a collection that he laid out in his home in Philadelphia.

Purvis supported many progressive causes in addition to abolition. With Lucretia Mott, he supported women's rights and suffrage. He was a member of the American Equal Rights Association while Mott was president. Purvis also attended the founding meeting of the Pennsylvania Woman Suffrage Association.

He supported temperance and similar social issues. He believed in integrated groups working for greater progress for all. By the end of the Civil War, which gained the emancipation of slaves and suffrage for black men, Purvis had reached his late 50s and became less active in political affairs.

== Lombard Street riot ==
Irish Catholics, often competitors for the lowest-paying, unskilled and menial jobs, perceived successful African-American residents in the city as flaunting their success. Immigrants expressed their frustrations and jealousy in various attacks on blacks.

A three-day race riot began on August 1, 1842. The mostly Irish rioters set fires and attacked firefighters and police as they went, heading for Purvis's home, where they protested outside for forty hours. Purvis and his home were reportedly saved from the Irish mob solely by a Catholic priest's intervention.

== Death and legacy ==
Neither of Purvis's elder sons survived the American Civil War. Both William P. Purvis (1832–1857) and Robert Purvis (1834–1862) were buried in the Byberry burial ground in northeast Philadelphia. When the burial ground of St. Thomas African Episcopal Church was closed, where his mother had been buried in central Philadelphia, Purvis had her remains transferred to Fair Hill Burial Ground in Philadelphia's Fairhill neighborhood. His wife (1810-1875) and daughter Georgiana (1848-1877) who had died of consumption were buried here, as he was in 1898.

His abolitionist efforts are memorialized by the Commonwealth of Pennsylvania and by the National Park Service.

== See also ==
- List of African-American abolitionists
- Vigilant Association of Philadelphia
