= Julie Winch =

History professor and author in the United States

Julie Winch is a history professor and author in the United States. She was born in London. She wrote a book about Philadelphia's black elite and edited, introduced, and footnoted Joseph Wilson's account of the city's elite before the Civil War. She also wrote a book about James Forten and the prominent family of Jacques Clamorgan in St. Louis and the Clamorgan family.

She spoke about James Forten at the Museum of the American Revolution. She reviewed Laura Arnold Leibman's book about a Jewish family.

== Writings ==
- Philadelphia's Black Elite; Activism, Accommodation, and the Struggle for Autonomy 1787-1848 Temple University Press (1988)
- A Gentleman of Color: The Life of James Forten Oxford University Press (2003)
- James Forten; Liberty's Black Champion (2011)
- The Clamogans; One Family's History of Race in America (2011)
- Between Slavery and Freedom; Free People of Color in America from Settlement to the Civil War Rowman & Littlefield (2014)

=== Editor ===
- The Colored Aristocracy of St. Louis University of Missouri Press (1999)
- The Elite of Our People; Joseph Willson’s Sketches of Black Upper-Class Life in Antebellum Philadelphia (2000) based on Sketches of the Higher Classes of Colored Society in Philadelphia (1841)

== See also ==
- Willard B. Gatewood
