= James Forten =

American activist, businessman and abolitionist (1766–1842)

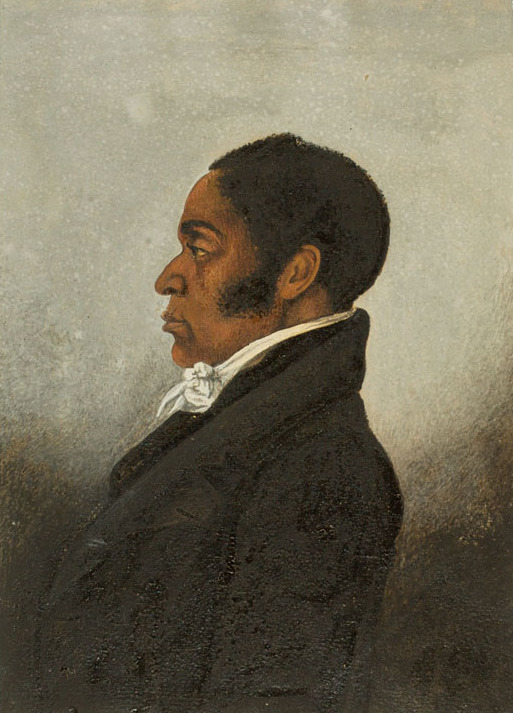
- Portrait of Forten, c. 1834, Robert Douglass Jr.
- Born: September 2, 1766; Philadelphia, Province of Pennsylvania, British America
- Died: March 4, 1842 (aged 75); Philadelphia, Pennsylvania, U.S.
- Occupations: Sailor, sailmaker, merchant, investor, businessman, landlord, essayist, abolitionist
- Spouses: Martha Beatty; Charlotte Vandine
- Children: 9, including Margaretta, Harriet, and Sarah
- Relatives: Robert Purvis (son-in-law); Charlotte Forten Grimké (granddaughter); Charles Burleigh Purvis (grandson); Harriet Purvis Jr. (granddaughter); William B. Purvis (grandson)

James Forten (September 2, 1766 – March 4, 1842) was an American abolitionist, activist and businessman in Philadelphia, Pennsylvania. An early Black Patriot, and a staunch supporter of American independence, he was perhaps one of the most prominent Black leaders of the post colonial era. He is often referred to as one of America's "Black Founding Fathers."

Born to free parents in 1766, he became a sailmaker after serving in the American Revolutionary War. Following an apprenticeship, he became the foreman and bought the sail loft when his boss retired. Based on equipment he himself had developed, he established a highly profitable business. It was located on the busy waterfront of the Delaware River, in an area now called Penn's Landing. Forten used his wealth and social standing to work for civil rights for Black Americans in both the city and nationwide. During the War of 1812, he, along with other black leaders such as Richard Allen and Absalom Jones, took part in the fortification and mobilizing of black troops in Philadelphia.

Beginning in 1817, he opposed the colonization movements, particularly that of the American Colonization Society, affirming Black Americans' claim to a stake in the United States of America. He persuaded William Lloyd Garrison to adopt an anti-colonization position and helped fund his newspaper The Liberator (1831–1865), frequently publishing letters on public issues. He became vice-president of the biracial American Anti-Slavery Society, founded in 1833, and worked for national abolition of slavery. His large family was also devoted to these causes, and two daughters married the Purvis brothers, who used their wealth as leaders for abolition. He devoted the rest of his life to mediating and supporting the abolitionist cause until his death in 1842.

== Early life and education ==
James Forten was born free on September 2, 1766, in Philadelphia, Pennsylvania, one of two children of Thomas and Margaret Forten; a Philadelphia sailmaker, Thomas Forten was the grandson of a slave who had "freed himself."

However, Thomas Forten died young (possibly because of falling from a high place), and his son James started to work at the age of seven to help his mother and sister. At first he was a chimney sweep, later becoming a grocery-store clerk. He also attended the Black School, run by Quaker abolitionist Anthony Benezet, who founded it to educate black children free of charge. His mother insisted that he continue in school, but by the age of nine, Forten had left school to work full-time. His early years of work became a measure for progress in his life and career.

At the age of 14, during the Revolutionary War, Forten served on the privateer Royal Louis, commanded by Captain Stephen Decatur Sr. The Royal Louis was captured by a Royal Navy warship. Captain John Beazley, who had captured the privateer, was impressed with Forten. Forten recalled that Beazley offered Forten the opportunity to be educated in Great Britain with his son, Henry, but Forten replied, "I have been taken prisoner for the liberties of my country, and never will prove a traitor to her interest." Beazley instead saw to it that he was treated as a prisoner of war along with the rest of the crew of the Royal Louis.

The prisoners were all transported to HMS Jersey, then moored in Wallabout Bay, later the site of the Brooklyn Navy Yard.

Forten was fortunate as he was exchanged after seven months' imprisonment. He was released on parole after giving a promise not to fight in the war. He walked from Brooklyn to Philadelphia to return to his mother and sister. He signed up on a merchant ship, which sailed to England. He lived and worked there for more than a year in a London shipyard.

When Forten returned to Philadelphia in 1790, he became apprenticed to sail-maker Robert Bridges, his father's former employer and a family friend. Forten learned quickly in the sail loft. This was where the large ship sails were cut and sewn. Before long, the young man was promoted to foreman.

== Career ==
At Bridges' retirement in 1798, Forten bought the sail loft. By developing a tool to help maneuver the large sails, by 1810, Forten had built up one of the most successful sail lofts in Philadelphia. He created the conditions he worked for in society, employing both black and white workers. Because of his business acumen, Forten became one of the wealthiest Philadelphians in the city, black or white.

== Marriage and family ==
James Forten married twice: his first wife, Martha Beatte (or Beatty) of Darby Township, Delaware County, died after only a few months of marriage (1804). In 1806, he married Charlotte Vandine (1785–1884). James and Charlotte Forten had nine children: Robert Bridges Forten, Margaretta, Harriet, Sarah Louisa, Charlotta, William Deas, Mary Theresa, Thomas Willing Francis, and James Jr. Robert and James Jr. succeeded their father in the family sail-making business.

The children grew up in and committed to the abolition movement. Robert, named for his father's former boss and mentor, was a vigorous anti-slavery activist. William studied at the abolitionist Oneida Institute. Sisters Harriet and Sarah Louisa married the prominent abolitionist brothers Robert Purvis and Joseph Purvis, respectively. Educated at Amherst College, they were sons of a British immigrant and his wife, a free woman of color. They used their great wealth in lives of public service. Margaretta was a lifelong educator and became an officer of the Philadelphia Female Anti-Slavery Society in 1845.

The Fortens' granddaughter Charlotte Forten Grimké became a poet, diarist and educator. Her diary from teaching men who were free and their children in the South after the Civil War became well known; it was republished in scholarly editions in the 1980s.

== Public activism ==
Having become well established, in his 40s Forten devoted both time and money to working for the national abolition of slavery and gaining civil rights for blacks. Forten was a member of Prince Hall Freemasonry which gave him a network of likeminded people who fought against discrimination. African Americans were severely discriminated against in Pennsylvania and the North, and generally could not vote or serve on juries. He felt a sense of obligation to work on these issues of his community. "...in 1801, he was among the signers of a petition to the U.S. Congress calling for the abolition of the slave trade and the modification of the Fugitive Slave Law of 1793."

In 1813 he wrote a pamphlet called Letters From A Man of Colour, published anonymously. (See External links below.) (Many people knew he had written it.) He denounced a bill under consideration in the Pennsylvania legislature that required all black emigrants to Pennsylvania to be registered with the state, and protested treating free blacks any differently than whites. Some legislators were worried about the number of free blacks who migrated into the state, competing with white laborers. In addition, they knew fugitive slaves often used Pennsylvania as a destination or byway to other free areas, as it was bordered by slave states to the south.

Forten believed the bill was a step backward for black Pennsylvanians. In his "Letters," Forten argued that the bill would violate the rights of any free blacks entering the state and set the people apart as somehow not equal to whites. Forten wanted the many respectable citizens of the black community to be recognized and valued. In the end, the bill was not passed, and James Forten became known for his succinct and passionate pamphlet.

In the early 19th century, some black and white Americans supported movements to "resettle" free blacks on the African continent, in Canada, or in Haiti, which achieved independence from France in 1804. In the late 18th century, the British had founded Freetown as a colony in present-day Sierra Leone, for the resettlement of Black Britons from London, together with those Black Loyalists who wanted to leave Nova Scotia. During the American Revolutionary War, the Crown had offered freedom to slaves who left Patriot masters. The British evacuated thousands of freed slaves along with their troops, and resettled more than 3,000 Black Loyalists in Nova Scotia, where it granted land. Others went to London or the West Indies.

The American Colonization Society (ACS) was formed in December 1816, organized to found the colony of Liberia in West Africa for a similar purpose. It offered to help blacks to go there voluntarily, with provisions of aid for supplies, housing and other materials. Made up of abolitionists, slaveholders, and missionaries, its members supported voluntary relocation of free blacks and newly freed slaves to Africa, to solve the "problem" of blacks in American society. In the first two decades after the Revolution, the number of free blacks rose significantly, due both to wholesale abolition of slavery in the North, as well as an increase in manumissions in the South by men moved by revolutionary ideals. In some areas, the new competition for social resources resulted in a rise in racial discrimination against free blacks. Southerners wanted to remove free blacks from their region, as they believed the free people destabilized slavery. Northerners thought a new colony might give the blacks more independence and a chance to create their own society. The proposal was also supported by clergy who expected the black Americans to evangelize Christianity to Africans. News about the organization, especially racist remarks by such leaders as Henry Clay of Kentucky, a national politician, raised fears among many free blacks that the ACS proposed to deport them wholesale to Africa.

Forten had supported Paul Cuffee, a Boston shipbuilder, who in 1815 transported 38 free blacks to Sierra Leone, with the idea they could make a better life where not impeded by white racism. He was well aware of continuing problems due to harsh discrimination against blacks in the United States.

To address community concerns and discuss the potential for colonization, James Forten worked with Bishop Richard Allen of the African Methodist Episcopal Church, the first independent black denomination in the United States; Absalom Jones, and James Gloucester to organize a meeting on this topic in Philadelphia. Their announced meeting in January 1817 at Bethel AME Church drew 3,000 attendees from Philadelphia. Hearing the strong views of this public forced a dramatic turning point for these leaders.

By this time, most free blacks and slaves had been born in the United States and claimed it as their own, with their own families. At the meeting, Forten called for a vote, asking who favored colonization. Not one man said yes. When he asked who was against it, the crowd resounded with "No!" that made the hall ring. All claimed the US as their own, and wanted to gain their full civil rights there as citizens. After that meeting, Forten and the ministers strongly opposed the ACS, and Forten later converted William Lloyd Garrison, a younger white abolitionist from Boston, against the colonization schemes. Following the January meeting, Forten helped draft a Resolution of the sense of the public, which he and other leaders sent to the Pennsylvania congressional delegation. In August they published a longer "Address to the Inhabitants of the City and County of Philadelphia," which attacked colonization.

He absorbed his community's arguments and noted that most American blacks had been in the United States for many generations and had claim to it as their land. Although the ACS advertised Liberia as a place of opportunity for free blacks, the colony struggled to survive and many colonists died of disease. There were risks of re-enslavement by illegal slave traders and smugglers. Relationships with the native Africans were not desirable.

After Haiti became established as an independent black republic in 1804, some Americans were interested in emigrating there. In the early 1820s, President Jean-Pierre Boyer united all the island of Hispaniola under Haitian control. (Eastern Hispaniola would later rebel against Haitian rule and declare independence as the Dominican Republic in 1844). He also gained official recognition for the nation from France for the first time, but at the cost of a high indemnity that crippled the country financially for generations. He appealed to American free blacks to immigrate there and help its development. Its independence raised many complex issues for free Blacks in the United States. Despite his support for the new nation, Forten was among important Black leaders who opposed immigration for Americans. He firmly believed that Blacks should be allowed to play an equal role in their land of the United States. He consistently said that it was far better for them to fight for an egalitarian US society rather than to flee the country.

Forten helped William Lloyd Garrison start up his newspaper, The Liberator, in 1831, supporting it financially. He frequently published letters in it, as "A Colored Man of Philadelphia." Garrison also wrote articles against colonization, describing the poor living conditions in Liberia. They wanted others to know that the ACS was not necessarily working in the best interest of black Americans.

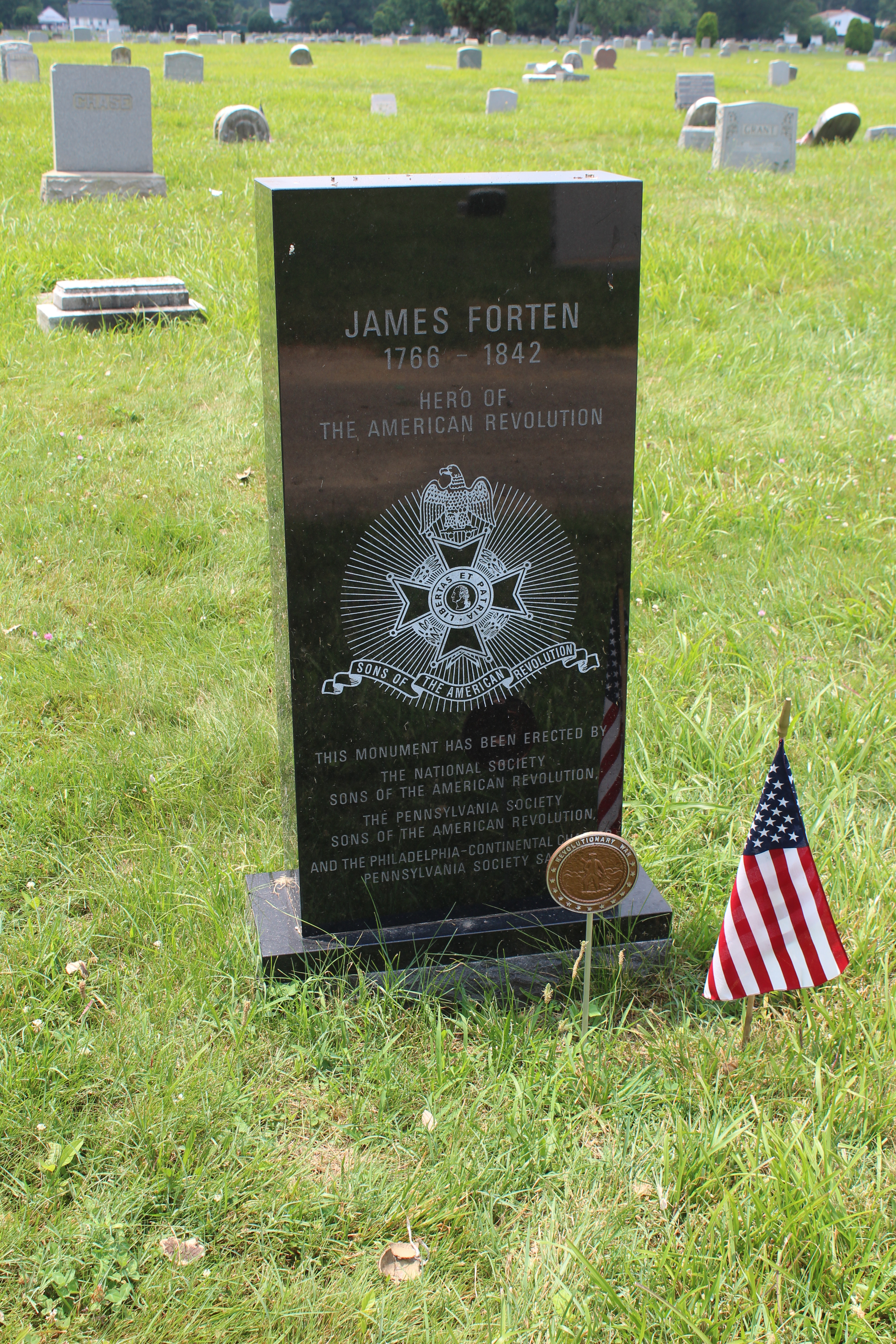
James Forten gravestone in Eden Cemetery

According to his biographer Julie Winch:

By the 1830s, his was one of the most powerful African-American voices, not just for men and women of color in his native city, but for many thousands more throughout the North. He knew how to use the press and the speaker's podium. He knew about building alliances, when to back down and when to press forwards with his agenda. His rise to prominence, his understanding of the nature of power and authority, his determination to speak out and be heard are object lessons in the realities of community politics. Disfranchised he might have been, but voiceless he never was.

James Forten managed his sail loft and stayed active in the abolitionist movement until very late in his life, continuing to write for The Liberator. He died on March 4, 1842, at the age of 75 in Philadelphia. Thousands of people, both black and white, attended his funeral.

== Death ==
He died on March 4, 1842, in Philadelphia, Pennsylvania and is interred at Eden Cemetery in Collingdale, Pennsylvania.

== Legacy and honors ==
Bolden wrote of him: "When James Forten died, he left behind an exemplary family, a sizable fortune, and a legacy of philanthropy and activism that inspired generations of black Philadelphians."

In 2001, scholar Molefi Kete Asante listed James Forten on his list of 100 Greatest African Americans.

In February 2023, the Museum of the American Revolution in Philadelphia will open the first-ever museum exhibition dedicated to Forten's life and family, Black Founders: The Forten Family of Philadelphia.

== See also ==
- List of abolitionists
- List of African-American abolitionists
- Vigilant Association of Philadelphia
