= Sarah Louisa Forten Purvis =

American abolitionist, suffragist

- Born: Sarah Louisa Forten; 1814; Philadelphia, Pennsylvania, US
- Died: 1884 (aged 69–70); Philadelphia, Pennsylvania, US
- Other names: Ada, Magawisca
- Occupations: Writer, abolitionist
- Spouse: Joseph Purvis
- Children: 8, including William B. Purvis
- Parents: James Forten (father); Charlotte Vandine Forten (mother)
- Relatives: Harriet Forten Purvis (sister), Margaretta Forten (sister)

Sarah Louisa Forten Purvis (1814–1884) was an American poet and abolitionist from Philadelphia, Pennsylvania. She co-founded The Philadelphia Female Anti-Slavery Society and contributed many poems to the anti-slavery newspaper The Liberator.

== Biography ==
Purvis (née Forten) was born in 1814 in Philadelphia, Pennsylvania. She was one of the "Forten Sisters." Her mother was Charlotte Vandine Forten and her father was the African American abolitionist, James Forten. Sarah Louisa Forten Purvis's sisters were Harriet Forten Purvis (1810–1875), and Margaretta Forten (1808–1875). The three sisters, along with their mother, were founders of the Philadelphia Female Anti-Slavery Society in 1833. This society was not the first female Anti-Slavery society. However, this society was particularly important because of the role it played in the development of American feminism.

Sarah Louisa Forten Purvis was a poet. She is cited in some scholarship as used the pen names, "Ada" and "Magawisca," as well as her own name. There is some conflict surrounding the poetry under the pen names of "Ada" as it has been argued that certain poems with this pen name may have been inaccurately attributed to Forten Purvis. She is credited with writing many poems about the experience of slavery and womanhood. Some of Forten Purvis's most well known works include "An Appeal to Woman" and "The Grave of the Slave." Both of which were published in the abolitionist newspaper The Liberator. The poem "The Grave of the Slave" was subsequently set to music by Frank Johnson, and the song was often used as an anthem at antislavery gatherings. While the poem "An Appeal to Woman" was utilized in the pamphlets for the Anti-Slavery Convention of New York in 1837.

In 1838 Sarah married Joseph Purvis with whom she had eight children, including William B. Purvis. Joseph Purvis was the brother of Robert Purvis, who was the husband of Sarah's sister Harriet.

She died in 1884 in Philadelphia. Though some works that speak about her life and poetry state she died in 1857. This discrepancy may be related to the misattribution of some of her poems.

== Education ==
Sarah Louisa Forten Purvis and her sisters received private educations and were members of the Female Literary Association, a sisterhood of Black women founded by Sarah Mapps Douglass, another woman of a prominent abolitionist family in Philadelphia. Sarah began her literary legacy through this organization where she anonymously developed essays and poems.

== Written work ==
Motherhood and Daughterhood within the context of slavery are made example of within Forten Purvis's poetry. These perspectives come from a personal place according to Julie Winch (a writer of History at the University of Massachusetts), and are informed by Forten Purvis's ancestry, status and intellectual background. Though Forten Purvis was never herself oppressed through the chattel slavery system, her poetry extensively made example of the anguish within the experience of being enslaved as a woman of African descent. The notion of cultural kinship was present within much of her poetry. Additionally, the marginalization and oppression exemplified within her poetry is shown to be compounded in many cases by the gendered nature of the poetry. These poems, though primarily about the lived experiences of those within the slavery system, also work to show the lived experience of women as intersecting with their race. Examples of the experience of racism as informed by the experience of womanhood can be seen within "An Appeal to Women", "The Slave Girl's Address to her Mother", "A Mother's Grief", and "The Slave Girl's Farewell."

Published Poetry by Sarah Louisa Forten Purvis
Poem Title	Year	Published In	Author
"An Appeal to Women" of the Nominally Free States	1837	Anti Slavery Convention of American Women	Sarah Louise Forten
"The Farewell"	1832	The Liberator (Newspaper)	Sarah Louise Forten
"The Grave of the Slave"	1831	The Liberator (Newspaper)	Sarah Louise Forten
"A Mother's Grief"	1832	The Liberator (Newspaper)	Sarah Louise Forten
"Prayer"	1831	The Liberator (Newspaper)	Sarah Louise Forten
"The Separation"	1833	The Liberator (Newspaper)	Sarah Louise Forten
"To the Hibernia"	1833	The Liberator (Newspaper)	Sarah Louise Forten
"The Slave Girl's Address to her Mother"	1831	The Liberator (Newspaper)	Sarah Louise Forten
"The Abuse of Liberty"	1831	The Liberator (Newspaper)	Sarah Louise Forten
"Hours of Childhood"	1834	The Liberator (Newspaper)	Sarah Louise Forten
"A Slave Girl's Farewell"	1835	The Liberator (Newspaper)	Sarah Louisa Forten
"Past Joys"	1831	The Liberator (Newspaper)	Sarah Louise Forten
"My Country"	1834	The Liberator (Newspaper)	Sarah Louise Forten

== Feminist contributions ==
Forten Purvis's poetic contributions to feminist activism has been discussed within the academic world as an equally considerable contribution to intersectionality. For example, Forten Purvis's Poem "An Appeal to Women" is identified through the lens of race and womanhood within Janet Gray's book "Race and Time" (2004). Similarly, Julie Winch discusses Forten Purvis's relationship to both Womanhood and Race. It is identified that this poem, which was distributed and read allowed to the attendees of the antislavery convention for women in 1873, spoke primarily to the white women of this period. In particular, it urged them to join in solidarity with their African-American female counterparts as a sisterhood in the fight against slavery. Gray suggests that what makes this poem inherently intersectional in its feminism is Forten Purvis's identification of the plurality of being Black and being female in comparison to the lived experience of being a white woman. Additionally, this poem makes mention of the self-objectification of white women's "fairness" as synonymous with their social value, and as opposed to the agency of black women as something more than merely "fairness" (Fairness in this case as related to complexion). Forten Purvis's poem conversely plays on white women's "fairness" as a "virtue" or more contemporarily put, a mark of privilege and further calls for white women to use their "virtue" for activism in the defense of their Black sisters. It is suggested that Forten Purvis's poetry, transforms the female listener into an agent of change.

=== Poetry ===
As can be noted in additional poetry from Forten Purvis, the dualistic nature of blackness in relation to womanhood is a common theme. This intersectional dissemination of feminist ideals and the perspective and experiences of black women through poetry cannot be investigated separately. Ira V. Brown additionally specifies that the women who acted within the Philadelphia Female Anti Slavery society, through whatever those actions were (in Forten Purvis's case, creative poetry) were contributors to what she called "The Cradle of Feminism."

=== Correspondence ===
On the topic of Prejudice, Forten Purvis believed that all people regardless of gender had a responsibility to act as political catalysts in the Abolition of slavery. This is evidenced by her letter to Angelina Grimke, written on April 15 of 1837. It specified that man or woman were to be equal contributors to the cause and that women, regardless of their politically oppressions condition at the time must consider their "sisters" and act upon this consideration.

=== Sketches ===
Forten Purvis also made contributions to the imagery of the emblem of the female supplicant. Adapting this emblem according to their own devices, many women within American drew renditions of the emblem. Forten Purvis being one of them. As specified by Jean Fagan Yellin, Forten Purvis privately added her rendition of the emblem as a sketch into Elizabeth Smith's album.

== Misattribution of some works ==
As identified, some of Forten Purvis's works may have been under the pen names of "Ada" or "Magawisca." According to some scholars, a Quaker abolitionist by the name of Eliza Earle Hacker (1807-1846), from Rhode Island, had been the author of what many thought to be some of Forten Purvis's work. Though there is little evidence as to which poems are not in fact Forten Purvis's. There are some possible distinctions. The fact that Forten Purvis's "Ada" signature always comes with a specifier as to the place with which the poetry was written, while Hackers "Ada" does not, indicates the potential for separation of the authors work. Regardless, many Anti-Slavery and Abolition Authors used pen names to protect their identity and as a result, it has become difficult to attribute certain works to certain individuals. For this reason the chart only includes works in which the place of original is specified as being Philadelphia (Forten Purvis's home state).

Specifically, Ada's poem "Lines: Suggested on Reading 'An Appeal to Christian Women of the South' by Angelina Grimké," was most likely written by Hacker but often attributed to Forten and included in African-American writing anthologies.
