= Charlotte Vandine Forten =

African-American abolitionist

- Born: Charlotte Vandine; 1785; Philadelphia, Pennsylvania. U.S.
- Died: 1884 (aged 98–99); Philadelphia, Pennsylvania, U.S.
- Spouse: James Forten
- Children: 9, including Harriet Forten Purvis, Margaretta Forten, Sarah Louisa Forten Purvis

Charlotte Vandine Forten (1785–1884) was an American abolitionist and matriarch of the Philadelphia Forten family.

== Biography ==
Forten née Vandine was born in 1785 in Philadelphia, Pennsylvania. she married James Forten on December 10, 1805.

The couple had many children; the most notable were Harriet Forten Purvis, Margaretta Forten, and Sarah Louisa Forten Purvis often referred to as the "Forten Sisters". Her granddaughter Charlotte Forten Grimké (1837–1914) was a prominent abolitionist and educator. Charlotte and her daughters were founders of the Philadelphia Female Anti-Slavery Society (PFASS) in 1833. She was sent by her family to Salem not just in a pursuit of education opportunity but also of personal protection. According to the "Pennsylvania, Philadelphia City Death Certificates, 1803-1915" she died on December 30, 1884, in Philadelphia.

== Working experience ==
Charlotte Vandine Forten, as an abolitionist and suffragist, traveled to Washington D.C. with her husband to work in the government and taught school. Also, she founded the interracial Philadelphia Female Anti-Slavery Society encouraging the women's rights movement.
