= Sailmaker =

Person who makes and repairs sails

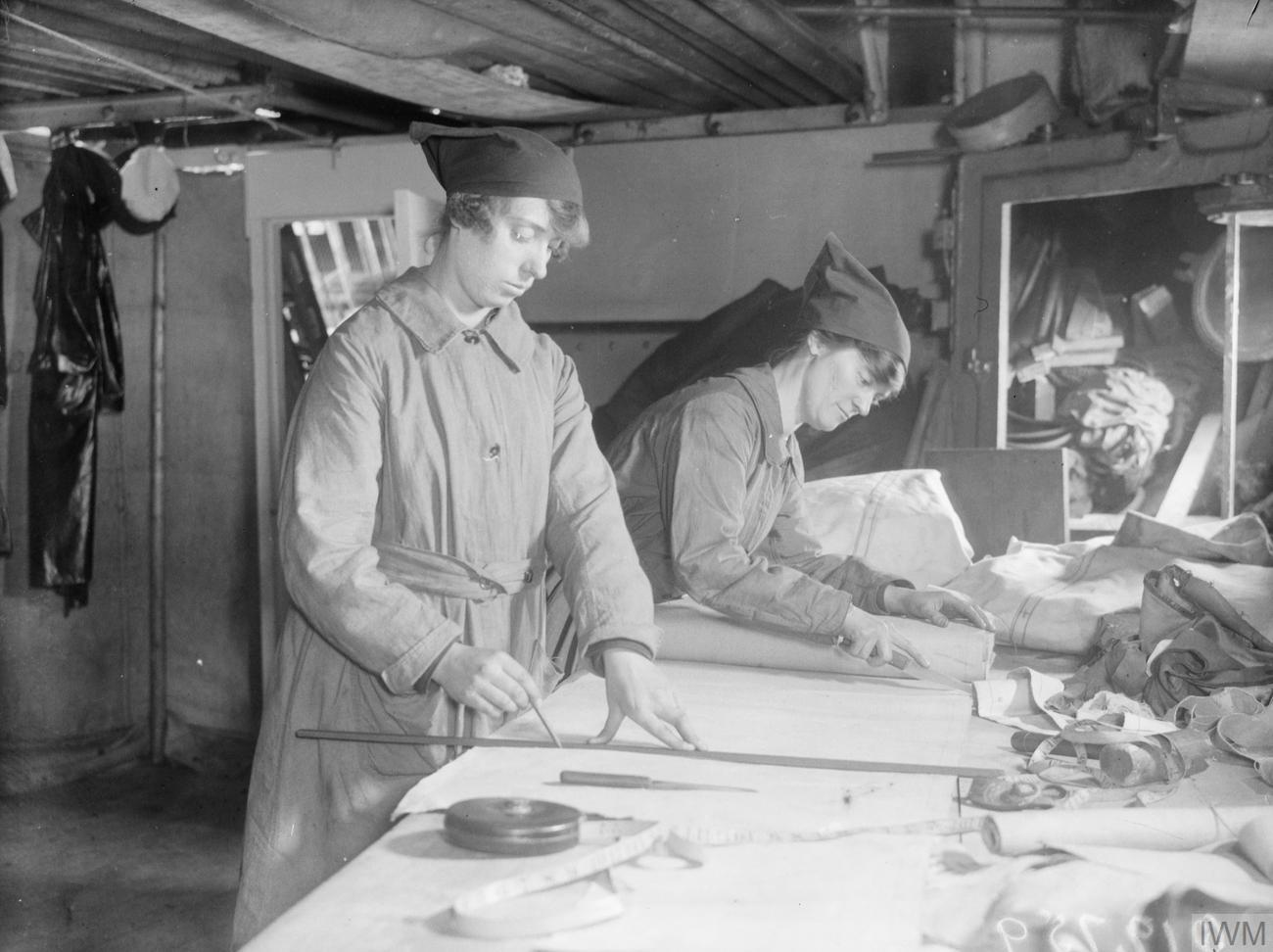
Sailmakers aboard HMS Essex during World War I

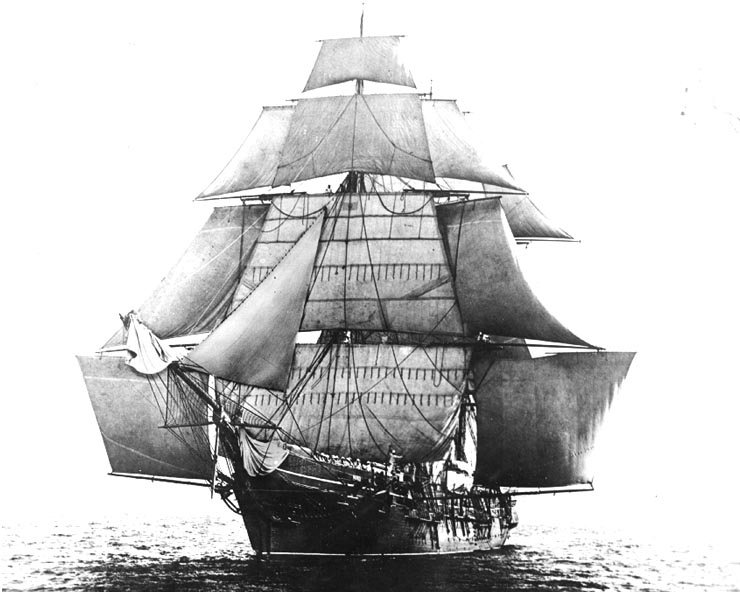
The USS Monongahela (1862), a vessel exemplifying the 19th-century sailmakers' craft

A sailmaker makes and repairs sails for sailboats, kites, hang gliders, wind art, architectural sails, or other structures using sails. A sailmaker typically works on shore in a sail loft; the sail loft has other sailmakers. Large ocean-going sailing ships often had sailmakers in the crew, maintaining and repairing sails. This required knowledge of the sailmaker's craft and the tools of the sailmakers loft on shore.

Today, one of a sailmaker's important jobs is to teach people how to set and trim their sails to get the most out of them. Sometimes a sailmaker will accompany the client out on the water and adjust the sails. The modern sailmaker uses computer-aided design and manufacturing tools. Computer graphics allow the sailmaker to produce a "lines drawing" of the sail. Once the design is complete, the sailmaker can now use a low-power laser to cut the material to the exact shape.

== Broadseam ==
=== CFD ===
Sailmakers have recently started using Computational fluid dynamics (CFD), the study of the flow of fluids over or through physical objects, in order to create more efficient sail or foil shapes in the design process.

After CFD analysis is run, complex data sets can be rendered graphically to enhance understanding of the design's likely results, before sails are ever cut.

== Sailmaker's tools ==
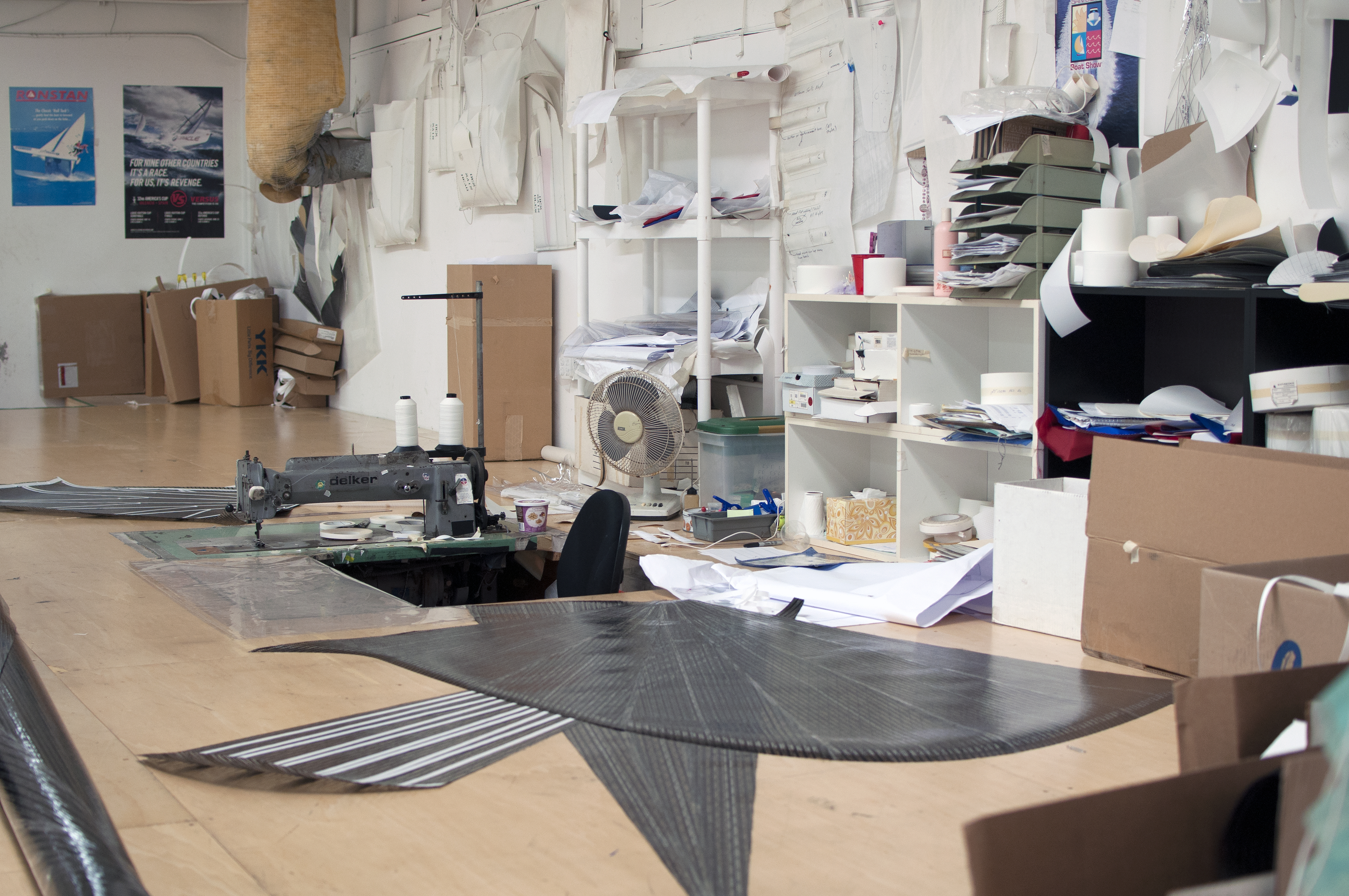
Sewing machine for sails

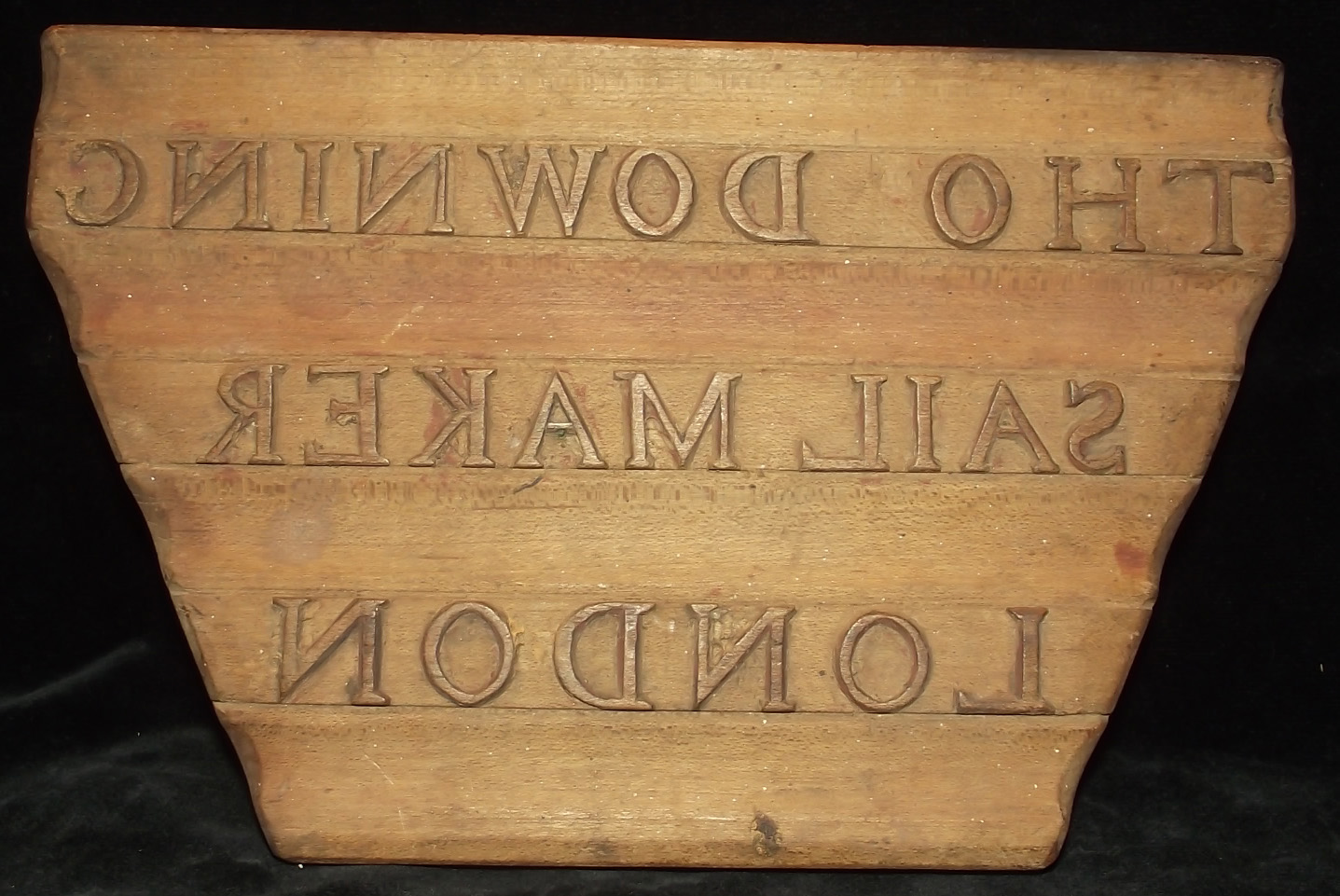
sailmaker's stamp for Thomas Downing, at The Mariners Museum

- Fid, used to stretch grommets before inserting reinforcement
- Sailmaker's palm, an oversized thimble used to drive needles through heavy canvas
- beeswax, used on thread
- Bench hook, to provide a "third hand" to hold sailcloth taut
- Seam rubber, to press folds in to fabric
- sailmaker's needles
- Sewing machine

== See also ==
- James Forten
- Kite types
- Lowell North
- David Ullman
