= Charles Burleigh Purvis =

African American physician

Dr. Charles B. Purvis
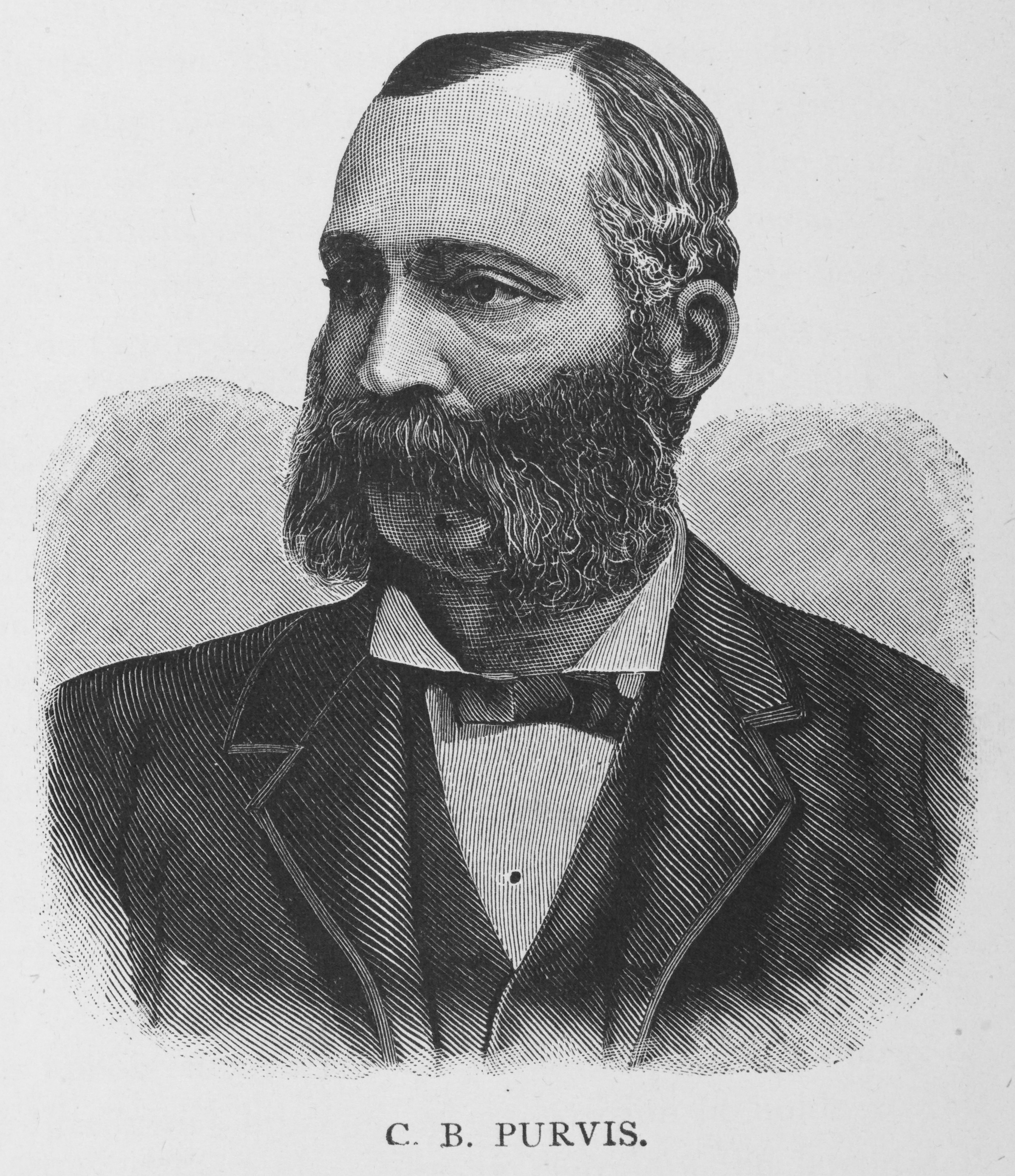
- Purvis in 1887
- Born: April 14, 1842; Philadelphia, Pennsylvania, US
- Died: December 14, 1929 (aged 87); Los Angeles, California, US
- Resting place: Mount Wollaston Cemetery
- Occupation: Physician
- Political party: Republican
- Parents: Robert Purvis (father); Harriet Forten Purvis (mother)
- Relatives: Harriet Purvis, Jr. (sister)

Dr. Charles Burleigh Purvis (April 14, 1842 – December 14, 1929) was an African-American physician who resided in Washington, D.C. Among the founders of the medical school at Howard University, he was the first African-American physician to attend a sitting president of the United States when he attended to President James Garfield after he was shot. Purvis was also the first black physician to head a hospital under civilian authority, when he was appointed as surgeon-in-charge of the Freedmen's Hospital that same year, as well as the first African-American person to serve on the D.C. Board of Medical Examiners and the second black instructor at an American medical school. In addition, he was a leading activist in civil rights and universal suffrage movements.

== Early life ==
Purvis was born in Philadelphia on April 14, 1842. Purvis's parents were abolitionists Robert Purvis and Harriet Forten Purvis, both free people of color. He was named after the prominent abolitionist and journalist Charles Burleigh. When he was two years old, the family moved to Byberry, a suburb of Philadelphia. Charles was the fifth of eight children and worked on the farm as a young man.

He attended some public schools, but most of his schooling was with the Quakers. He enrolled at Oberlin College in 1860 and stayed for two years but did not finish. In 1862, he entered the Medical College at Western Reserve in Cleveland.

== Medical career ==
In 1864, Purvis served in the Union Army in the U.S. Civil War as a military nurse at Camp Barker, which became a model for Freedmen's Hospital. He was the first African American to earn a Doctor of Medicine (MD) degree when he graduated from Case Western Reserve University School of Medicine in March 1865. Two months after graduation, he took the position of acting assistant surgeon with a rank of first lieutenant and was assigned to duty in Washington, D.C. He served in this role until 1869.

On June 9, 1869, Purvis and Alexander Thomas Augusta were proposed for membership of the Medical Society of D.C., a branch of the American Medical Association. They were considered eligible, but did not receive enough votes. Another black physician, A. W. Tucker, was proposed on June 23, but was also rejected. In response, these three formed the National Medical Society, made up of African Americans.

Purvis and Augusta were among the founders of Howard University Medical School. In the fall of 1868, Purvis was elected professor of materia medica and medical jurisprudence, a position which he held for five years. He was then appointed as chair of obstetrics and diseases of women and children. That year, he was elected secretary to the Medical Faculty. Purvis was very successful at Howard and was credited with keeping the medical department running during the financial panic of 1873.

On July 2, 1881, Purvis was the first doctor to attend to President James A. Garfield after he was shot. This made him the first black physician to attend to a sitting president of the United States. Later that year, Purvis was appointed by Garfield's successor, President Chester A. Arthur, as Surgeon-in-Charge at the Freedmen's Hospital (the former name of Howard University Medical School), serving from October 1, 1881, to 1894. In that role, he was the first black person to head a hospital under civilian authority. In a letter from 1908, Purvis said he believed he was removed by the Secretary of the Interior Hoke Smith in favor of a Democrat after a change in administrations, which was customary for political appointees under the spoils system.

In 1904, Purvis was granted a license to practice in Massachusetts and was admitted to the Massachusetts Medical Society. The following year, he moved to Boston. Purvis resigned from the Howard University medical school on May 28, 1907, and was appointed professor emeritus on January 21, 1908. Purvis's initial appointment at Howard was professor in the Medical Department in 1868. On May 24, 1908, he was elected a member of the Howard Board of trustees and served until his resignation on June 1, 1926.

== Other activities ==
In Washington, Purvis was close personal friends with many prominent leaders, including Frederick Douglass, Francis J. Grimke, Blanche K. Bruce, and Richard Theodore Greener. In 1881, Purvis joined James Monroe Gregory and George T. Downing in fighting against a proposed law before the U.S. House of Representatives that would create separate schools for black children. The trio created an organization to fight this discrimination. The group gathered many leading civil rights figures, having Frederick Douglass as president, Richard T. Greener as secretary, and also including Frederick G. Barbadoes, John F. Cook, Francis James Grimké, Milton M. Holland, Wiley Lane, William H. Smith, Purvis, Downing, and Gregory. The group was supported by representative Dudley C. Haskell (R-KS) and succeeded in forestalling the proposal.

Purvis was a Mason. He was the first black person to serve on the D. C. Board of Medical Examiners and the second black instructor in an American Medical School. He was given a LL.D. Degree from Howard University in 1914.

Purvis, along with his father and many others, was active in feminist movements and calls for universal suffrage. Purvis was criticized for not identifying only with blacks, having light skin, marrying a white woman, and sending his daughter to white public schools in DC.

== Personal life ==
Purvis married Ann Hathaway on April 13, 1871. They had two children: Alice, who became a physician, and Robert, who became a dentist. Purvis died in Los Angeles, California, on December 14, 1929. He was buried in Mount Wollaston Cemetery in the Merrymount neighborhood of Quincy, Massachusetts.

== Cultural depictions ==
Purvis' initial treatment of President Garfield was depicted in the 2016 episode Murder of a President from the PBS series American Experience, and the 2025 Netflix historical drama miniseries Death by Lightning where he is portrayed by actor Shaun Parkes.

== See also ==
- James Benjamin Parker, African-American who attempted to stop the assassination of president William McKinley
