= Margaretta Forten =

American activist and abolitionist (1806–1875)

- Born: September 11, 1806; Philadelphia, Pennsylvania, US
- Died: January 14, 1875 (aged 68); Philadelphia, Pennsylvania, US
- Known for: activism, suffragist, abolitionist
- Parents: James Forten (father); Charlotte Vandine Forten (mother)
- Relatives: Sarah Louisa Forten Purvis (sister), Harriet Forten Purvis (sister)

Margaretta Forten (September 11, 1806 – January 13, 1875) was an African-American suffragist and abolitionist.

== Biography ==
Margaretta Forten was born in Philadelphia, Pennsylvania, on September 11, 1806. Her parents, Charlotte Vandine Forten and James Forten, were abolitionists, and her father founded the American Moral Reform Society.

Because women were excluded from the American Anti-Slavery Society, Forten, with her mother Charlotte and sisters Sarah and Harriet, co-founded the Philadelphia Female Anti-Slavery Society with ten other women in 1833. The goal of this new society was to include women in the activism being done for the abolition of slavery, and "to elevate the people of color from their present degraded situation to the full enjoyment of their rights and to increased usefulness in society." (Brown, 145) Forten often served as recording secretary or treasurer of the Society, as well as helping to draw up its organizational charter and serving on its educational committee. She offered the Society's last resolution, which praised the post-civil war amendments as a success for the anti-slavery cause. The Society distinguished itself at the time as the first of its kind in the United States to be interracial. Although the Society was predominantly white, historian Janice Sumler-Lewis claims the efforts of the Forten women in its key offices enabled it to reflect a black abolitionist perspective that oftentimes was more militant.

Forten toured and gave speeches in favor of women's suffrage, as well as helping petition drives for the cause. She also worked as a teacher, teaching at a school run by Sarah Mapps Douglass in the 1840s, and opening her own school in 1850.

== Later life and death ==
Having never married, Forten returned to her childhood home in Philadelphia following the death of her father. She continued to reside there until her death at the age of 68 in Philadelphia on January 14, 1875. She is buried at the Saint James the Less Episcopal Churchyard Cemetery in Philadelphia.

== See also ==
- List of abolitionists
- List of African-American abolitionists
