= Harriet Forten Purvis =

American abolitionist (1810–1875)

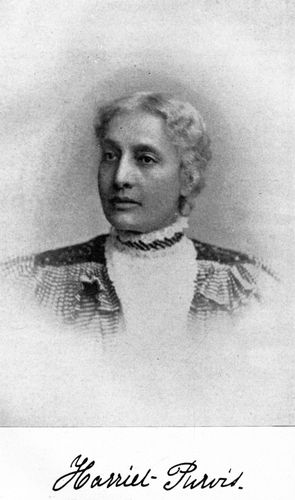
- Purvis c. 1874
- Born: Harriet Davy Forten c. 1810; Philadelphia, Pennsylvania, US
- Died: June 11, 1875 (aged 64–65); Washington, D.C., US
- Other name: Hattie Purvis Jr.
- Occupations: Abolitionist; suffragette; Underground Railroad station owner
- Spouse: Robert Purvis
- Children: 8, including Harriet Jr. and Charles
- Parents: James Forten (father); Charlotte Vandine Forten (mother)
- Relatives: Sarah Louisa Forten Purvis (sister); Margaretta Forten (sister)

Harriet Forten Purvis (c. 1810 – June 11, 1875) was an African-American abolitionist and first generation suffragist. With her mother and sisters, she formed the first biracial women's abolitionist group, the Philadelphia Female Anti-Slavery Society. She hosted anti-slavery events at her home and with her husband Robert Purvis ran an Underground Railroad station. Robert and Harriet also founded the Gilbert Lyceum. She fought against segregation and for the right for black people to vote after the Civil War.

== Personal life ==
=== Early life ===
Harriet Davy Forten, born in Philadelphia in about 1810, was one of eight children of James Forten and Charlotte Vandine Forten, who lived at 92 Lombard Street. James Forten was a wealthy inventor, businessman and abolitionist who was born free. Forten, born in 1766, was a powder boy and was taken prisoner from the Royal Lewis during the Revolutionary War. Her father was given a start in business by Robert Bridges, a white sailmaker. Harriet was named for one of Bridge's daughters. The Fortens, the most well-known black family in the city, were noted for their gentility and hospitality. William Lloyd Garrison wrote of the family "who have few superiors in refinement, in moral worth, in all that makes the human character worthy of admiration and praise."

James and Charlotte helped found and fund six abolitionist organizations. Many abolitionists who visited Philadelphia stayed in the Forten house. The first country's biracial abolitionist organization, the Philadelphia Female Anti-Slavery Society, was founded by Charlotte, her daughters, and Lucretia Mott. The Forten women were active members and officers.

Her father established a private school with Grace Douglass. Harriet and her siblings attended the school and was also taught foreign languages and music by private tutors. Her younger sisters were Sara and Margaretta, born in 1814 and 1815. There was also a sister named Mary Isabella. Her brothers were James, William Deas, Robert Bridges, and Thomas. The girls were raised to be refined women. Abolitionist and poet John Greenleaf Whittier wrote a verse for Harriet, expressing his admiration of her.

=== Interests ===
Harriet read a wide range of literature, including novels, religious works, literary criticism, antislavery literature, and William Shakespeare. She engaged in debate and enjoyed reading aloud, with a clear speaking voice. She sought people who had similar interests in music, art, and literature. Harriet was a member of the Black Female Literary Association, Edgeworth Literary Association, and Female Minervian Association.

=== Marriage and children ===
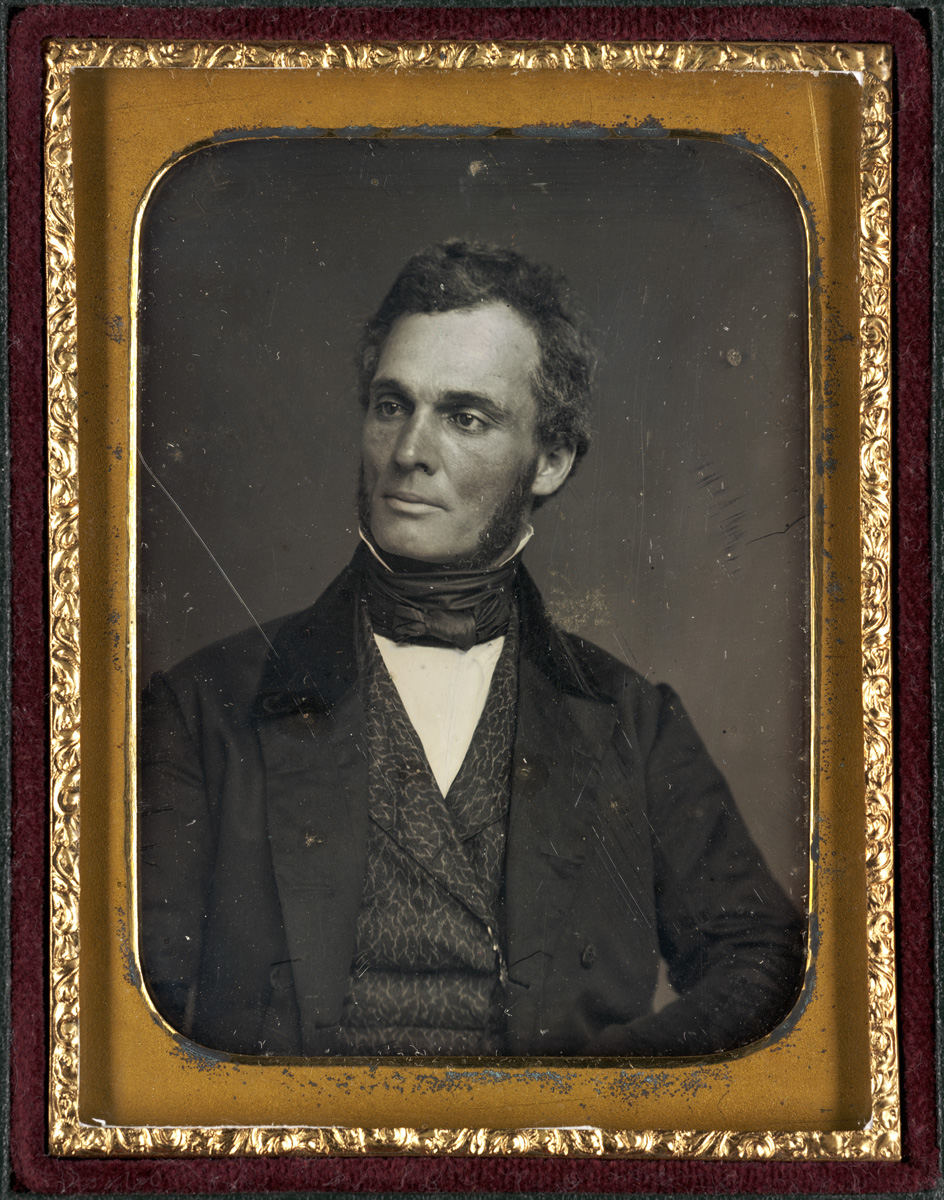
Robert Purvis (1810-1898), circa 1840-1849

She was married in her family's home on September 13, 1831, to a Mixed race American, Robert Purvis from South Carolina. Like her father, Purvis was a wealthy man with Moroccan and English lineage. They were married by an Episcopal bishop in an "elegant ceremony". Some people gossiped about the variation in their skin tone. Purvis, an abolitionist and anti-slavery lecturer, was very open about his family history. Harriet and Robert worked together on their shared interests, activism, and reform efforts.

The Purvises' egalitarian marriage and activist partnership presented a unique phenomenon. Few such relationships existed during the Victorian era. Their marriage demonstrated one man's commitment to the concepts of equality and freedom of expression. Further, it revealed one woman's ability to transcend contemporary mores to share in both the private and public spheres of her husband's life and work.
—Joe Trotter and Eric Ledell Smith

They employed servants, including an English governess, which made it possible for Harriet to actively work on the causes important to her. Harriet's elegant English-style house and grounds, called Saint's Rest by abolitionist Sallie Holley, had a calming and restful effect on its visitors. It was where: "the wicked cease from troubling and the weary are at rest." She was often hostess to visiting fellow activists and abolitionists, including William Lloyd Garrison, George Benson, and George Thompson. They had deep and long-term friendships with notable black and white reformers, under the belief that we are all "but one race". Others in the city rallied against blacks and people who aided refugee slaves, which erupted in race riots and violence in the 1830s. In 1834, 44 churches and buildings owned by blacks were set on fire.

Harriet's sister Sarah, who married Robert's brother Joseph Purvis, wrote articles and poems for the Liberator under pseudonyms. Frank Johnson, a black band leader, wrote music for her poem The Grave of the Slave, which was often played at anti-slavery events. They lived near Robert and Harriet's family in Byberry. Harriet's brother Robert was left a widower about 1840 and his daughter, Charlotte, lived with the Purvis's and received her education from a private tutor. Due to segregation in Philadelphia, Robert did not think that she would get a good education in the city. Charlotte "drew personal comfort and intellectual delight" from her aunt. Charlotte then lived in Salem, Massachusetts with another prominent black family in 1853.

Harriet's eight children were one to eighteen years of age in 1850. Charles Burleigh Purvis was a physician, medical school educator, and the first African American to run a civilian hospital. He attended Oberlin College and Wooster Medical College (Western Reserve). During the Civil War, he served as both a physician and nurse for the Union Army.

=== Relationship with Lucretia Mott ===
Harriet was twenty when she was introduced to the Mott family and maintained a friendly relationship with Lucretia Mott until her passing. Harriet and Robert's abolitionist work in Philadelphia allowed them to build a close relationship with Lucretia and James Mott. Harriet and Lucretia were among the founding members of the Philadelphia Female Anti-Slavery Society. The society strengthened the relationship between Harriet and Lucretia, and they were among the first women to join the Pennsylvania Anti-Slavery Society when it started accepting women in 1839.

In 1850, the two women visited New York Central College. Three of Harriet's sons attended the college, and Lucretia had been asked to deliver the college's first commencement address on July 4, 1850.

One of Lucretia Mott's favorite possessions was an embroidered work bag that Harriet had made for an Anti-Slavery Fair during the 1850s.

== Activist ==
=== Abolitionist and rights activist ===
Early in their marriage, Harriet had the couple's first child and Robert lectured against slavery across the country. Harriet was a member of the Philadelphia Female Anti-Slavery Society and, while pregnant, attended the Women's Anti-Slavery Convention in New York in 1837 with two of her sisters. In 1838, the convention was held in Philadelphia at the new Pennsylvania Hall, which was built by the Pennsylvania Anti-Slavery Society. Robert Purvis helped his wife out of the carriage and angry people who looked on thought that they were an interracial couple promoting "amalgamation" of the races. The hall was destroyed when it was set on fire by a group of people who were pro-slavery. The convention then convened at teacher and abolitionist Sarah Pugh's school. Black and white women participated as equals in the organization, which rare at the time. It also generated reactions among people who feared mixture of the races, or miscegenation, and were generally concerned about women's intervention in public affairs.

Not put off by the riot the previous year, Harriet attended the convention the following two years. She was a delegate at the 1838 and 1839 conventions. Unable to rent a hall in Philadelphia in 1839, the convention met at a riding stables. Harriet co-chaired Philadelphia Women's Anti-Slavery Society fairs, which between 1840 and 1861 raised $32,000 (equivalent to $1,238,400 in 2025). In 1841, the group rallied against the exclusion of black Sunday schools at the annual Sunday School exhibition in Independence Square. The following year, it was a biracial event.

After the Thirteenth Amendment was passed, Purvis continued her efforts to improve the rights of African Americans. The Female Antislavery Society continued to meet and in September 1866 to discuss the status of the South. Robert and Harriet became involved with the Pennsylvania State Equal Rights League and American Equal Rights Association, and served on the executive committee. She spoke for the right to vote for women and blacks and against segregation.

Harriet, Robert, and Octavius Catto worked to desegregate streetcars in Philadelphia. This was done in conjunction with the Pennsylvania State Equal Rights League. In 1867, a state law was passed that provided equal access to the public vehicles for all races.

=== Free produce movement ===
Harriet became involved in the Free Produce Society. Its members purchased local produce and boycotted produce grown and picked by slaves. She was often a delegate to the Free Produce Conventions and was a member of the Colored Free Produce Association. Harriet only bought produce and products that was not made or grown by slaves. It was an activity that she continued even after some, like Garrison, question its effectiveness. Purvis, Lucretia Mott, and Sarah Pugh stayed true to their stance on free produce as a matter of principle. As author Carol Faulkner states, they "believed that hypocrisy threatened the success of their crusade."

=== Underground Railroad ===
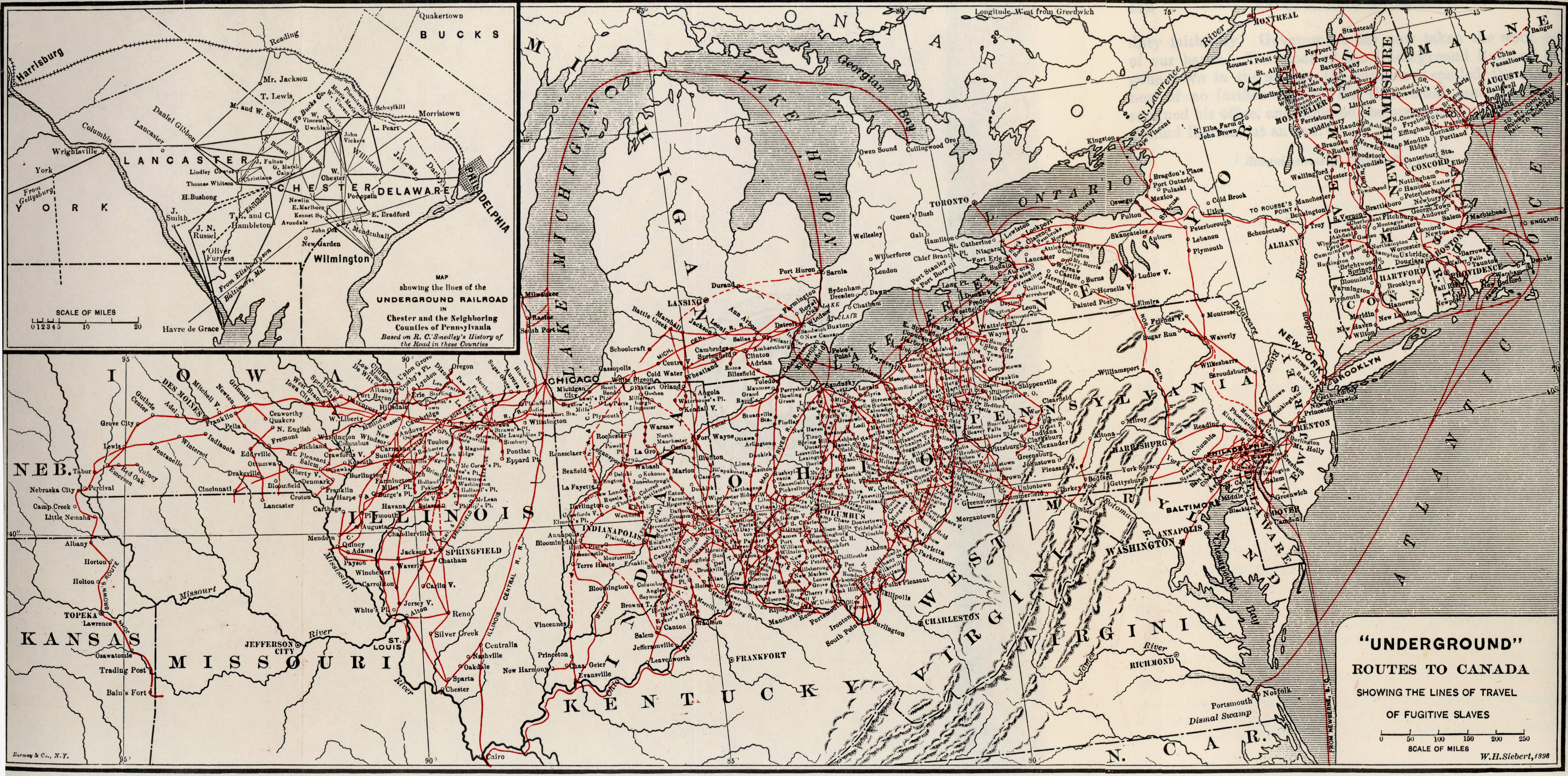
Map of Underground Railroad routes

Harriet and Robert, called the father of the Underground Railroad for his founding of Philadelphia's Vigilance Committee, began a station in their home at 9th and Lombard Street in Philadelphia. The situation became dangerous in central Philadelphia and the family moved to a farm in rural Byberry, Philadelphia in 1843 or 1844. They assisted about 9,000 runaway slaves along their journey to Canada. Slaves were hidden from authorities in their Byberry house through a trap door that Robert installed in the floor. Harriet hosted meetings of abolitionists in her house and was a leader of the Female Vigilant Society, which provided monies for transportation and clothing to the travelers.

=== Education ===
She saw the need for anti-slavery legislation and means to affect greater equality for African Americans in greater clarity as a mother. Private schools for African Americans were not as good as the public schools for whites. And her children would be subject to racial prejudice, even though the family lived a financially comfortable life.

The Byberry Friends Meeting, a Quaker meeting house, was located across the street from the Purvis house. The Purvis children attended the Byberry Friend School. Also nearby was the Friends' Library Company and Philosophical Society and Purvis Hall, which was built by Robert Purvis in 1846 and was a meeting location for anti-slavery meetings and other community activities. Robert Purvis refused to pay the local school tax in 1853, since his children would not be afforded an education in the schools. Their children were educated by private tutors and at Quaker schools. Harriet and her husband founded the Gilbert Lyceum.

=== Suffragist ===
Harriet was a member of the National Woman Suffrage Association and a friend of Susan B. Anthony and Lucretia Mott, who also worked for the right to vote for blacks and women, against slavery, and for safe passage of refugee slaves. Harriet and her sister Margaretta Forten were key organizers of the Fifth National Women's Rights Convention in Philadelphia in 1854. Harriet's daughter, Hattie became the first African American vice president of the organization. Harriet's sisters and Charlotte were also first generation suffragists. Other black women who worked for women's right to vote included Sojourner Truth, Amelia Shadd, Mary Ann Shadd Cary, Nancy Prince, and Francis Ellen Watkins Harper.

== Later years ==
In 1873, Robert and Harriet moved to a Mount Vernon neighborhood with Georgianna and Harriet, who were still at home. They kept their Byberry home, Harmony Hall, and rented it to the Pierce family.

The family was beset by a series of illnesses. Three of their sons died, one from meningitis and the others from tuberculosis, which was the cause of Harriet's death on June 11, 1875. She died in Washington, D.C., where Robert worked as commissioner of Freedman's Saving Bank, and was buried in Germantown at the Quaker Fair Hill Burial Ground at 9th and Cambria.

Two years after her death, a daughter died. Robert moved to a house in Mount Vernon, Philadelphia. He married the Quaker poet Tacie Townsend, a white woman from Byberry, about 1878.

== In other media ==
- Letters to Aunt Hattie, a play written and performed by Gilletta "Gigi" McGraw
  - Performances:
    - February 2, 2020, Brandywine River Museum of Art, as part of Art of the Vote presented by PNC Arts Alive.
    - February 22, 2020, hosted by the Burlington County, NJ, Women's Advisory Council at the Burlington County Library Auditorium.
- Character in Sarah’s Poem, a play written by Charissa Menefee, Harriet Forten Purvis played by Ray-Nita Powell, presented in March 2018 as part of Rover Dramawerks' Fourth Annual 365 Women A Year Festival.

== See also ==
- African-American history
