= Vigilant Association of Philadelphia =

Anti-slavery organization

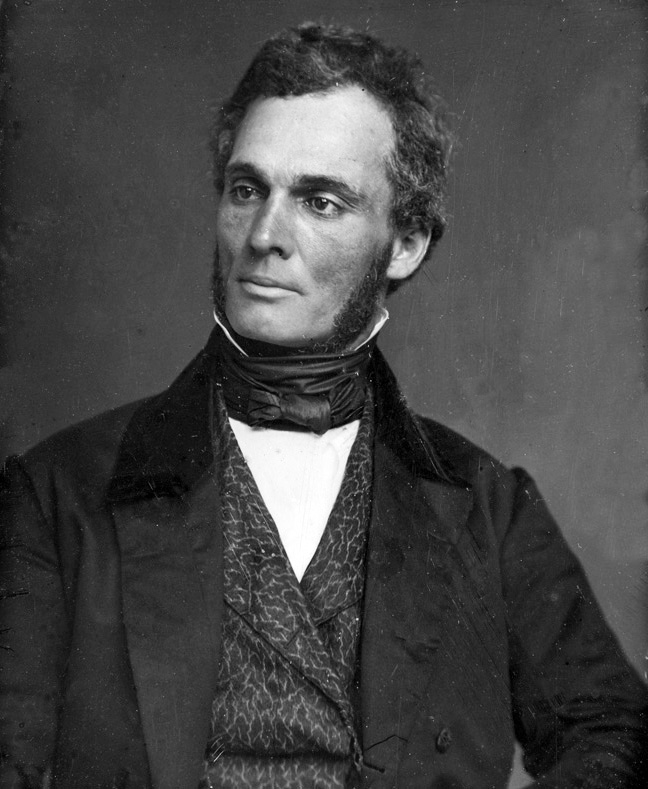
Founder Robert Purvis in the 1840s

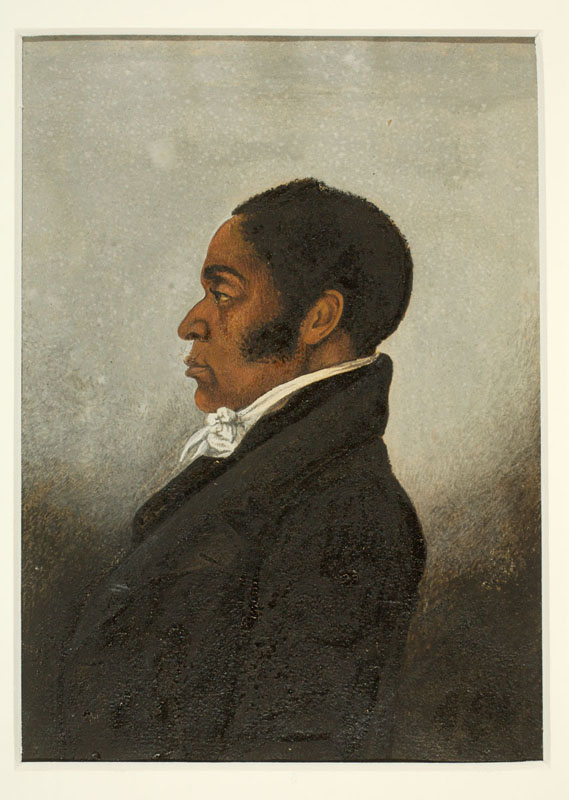
Co-founder James Forten

The Vigilant Association of Philadelphia was an abolitionist organization founded in August 1837 in Philadelphia to "create a fund to aid colored persons in distress". The initial impetus came from Robert Purvis, and his father-in-law, businessman James Forten. Other key members include William Still, a founder of the vigilance committee.

The Association operated initially from 1837-1842, when it was suspended after the Lombard Street riot, and then again from 1852-1861, after the passage of the Fugitive Slave Act in 1850.

== History ==
Robert Purvis first organized in 1834, alongside eleven others, to consider helping fugitive slaves. The Vigilant Association itself was formed in August 1837, after continued confrontations between Philadelphia's black community and slave catchers. The organization assisted runaway slaves from Southern states in relocating, either somewhere in the Northern state or in Canada.

The group was active until 1842, when the Lombard Street race riot shook the confidence of the group's leadership. Activity resumed in 1852 after the passage of the Fugitive Slave Act in 1852. It remained active until 1861, the year that the Civil War began.

Its executive was the Vigilant Committee of Philadelphia and its first president was a black dentist, James McCrummell. Other abolitionists who helped included John Greenleaf Whittier, who helped form the committee and promoted the association in his newspaper Pennsylvania Freeman.

There were five members of the acting committee for the Vigilant Association of Philadelphia, which included Nathaniel W. Depee, William Still, Jacob C. White, Passmore Williamson, and Charles Wise.

In June 1842, future writer Harriet Jacobs was among the fugitive slaves who were aided by the Association.

== See also ==
- Henry Box Brown
