= Grimké =

Grimké is a surname. Notable people with the surname include John Faucheraud Grimké of South Carolina and six of his descendants:

- John Faucheraud Grimké (1752–1819)
- Sarah Moore Grimké (1792–1873)
- Angelina Emily Grimké (1805–1879)
- Charlotte Forten Grimké (1837–1914))
- Archibald Henry Grimké (1849–1930)
- Francis James Grimké (1852–1937)
- Angelina Weld Grimké (1880–1958)
- Grimké sisters, Sarah Moore Grimké and Angelina Emily Grimké jointly

== See also ==
- Charlotte Forten Grimké House
- Grimke (crater), Venusian feature named to honour Sarah Moore Grimké
- Justice Grimke (disambiguation)
- John Grimké Drayton
