= Old Maidism Versus Marriage =

Old Maidism Versus Marriage is a short story by Susan Petigru King from her collection Busy Moments of an Idle Woman (New York: Appleton, 1853). In comparison to similar works from King's Southern contemporaries, the story is atypical in both form and content. King achieves this by including a series of six epistolary narratives within a traditional third-person omniscient narrative to sharply criticize both the institution of marriage and the behaviors of aristocratic Southern housewives.

== Plot ==
=== Part I ===
On December 22, 1837, seven young Charleston belles are gathered in Mrs. Bloomfield's Oak Forest estate to celebrate the Christmas holidays. While waiting for their suitors to return from a nearby visit to Colonel Hunscome's, Caroline Bloomfield offers her “silver étui” to any girl who can create a suitable and entertaining form of distraction. The winning suggestion, proffered by Laura Stanley, dictates these seven women to compose and sign a shared contract. It stipulates that all the women must meet again, at the same house, ten years in the future, to share a bottle of Maraschino and celebrate their single status. Any woman who has since been married is not required to attend, but in their stead they must send a letter describing their lives as “wives or widows.”

The seven girls are characterized as such:

- Caroline Bloomfield: The protagonist, daughter of Mrs. Bloomfield. The most beautiful of the seven, Caroline is an “accomplished coquette” with a “spark of diablerie in her bright eye.” Caroline wears a braided black plait which “crowned her queenly brow with a natural tiara.”
- Laura Stanley: Caroline's best friend, not a traditional beauty, but “handsome nevertheless from her air of intelligence, fashion and elegance.” Laura attends to the conversation while reading over the Charleston Courier.
- Fanny Stanley: Laura's younger sister. She bears “an air of languor very seldom visible in this prettiest of pretty creatures.”
- Adelaide Clifton: A musician, Adelaide is “more striking than delicate in her appearance,” and “more like a Northern belle than a Southern gracieuse.”
- Louise Merrington: Described as a “soft, gentle maiden, with great blue eyes, luxuriant fair hair, a lovely figure, a sweet yielding smile, and rather sentimental and moonshiny altogether.”
- Julia Merrington: Louise's cousin, “very fairy-like” with “such a mischievous mouth.”
- Annie Hamilton: Another beauty, Annie is considered “with the exception of their young hostess [Caroline], the handsomest of all.”

=== Part II ===
Ten years later, on December 4, 1847, Caroline Bloomfield attends a large party in Charleston with her beau, the handsome Edward Allingham. The narrator pauses to focus in on Allingham's eyes:

Such eyes! Perhaps I dwell too much upon eyes, but they go a great way with me. I have a passion for eyes, and no fixed rules as regards my admiration. I have admired green eyes more than I ever shall black or blue ones, and small eyes, where great ones were defying me to find in them fault. If you tire (my possible reader) of my prosing about these ‘mirrors of the soul,’ pray forgive me, but take up the study yourself in your leisure house, and you will soon begin to watch all your acquaintances’ visual orbs, as I do mine, not much to the satisfaction of some. But to resume.

Edward is pressing Caroline for an answer to the question of marriage, but Caroline reminds him he must wait until December 23. She must return to Oak Forest the day before, to drink a bottle of Maraschino alone and read the testimonies of her six friends – all of whom are now married. Caroline has “determined to let my decision abide by what I can gather and judge from this trial.”

=== Part III ===
Caroline reads the contents of the six letters, and much to her despair they are each rather depressing:

- Laura Stanley: Her husband, Robert Leslie, has become loaded with debt. Since Mr. Leslie “does not fancy books,” Laura rarely reads or writes, and her harp has been “banished to the barn” so that she may focus on domestic responsibilities. She has a saddle-horse, “but Mr. Leslie likes his gait so much, that he generally rides him himself.”
- Adelaide Clifton: Her “liege lord” John Gilmore has forced her to give up playing piano, for he says “a woman becomes too much public property when she has people racing after her to listen to her playing and singing … a good housekeeper had better be in her kitchen than practicing love ditties.” She has not attended a party in three years, since her husband now hates them, and “it is not the style in this place for married women to go much into company.”
- Louise Merrington: Louise has married Harry Radnor and moved West. There she finds “every thing dismal and wretched. No neighbors; no society; a church ten miles off, and the nearest city fifty. Our house was small, dirty, unfurnished.” Harry is now “wedded to his own notions: in short, if truth must be out, he is dreadfully stubborn; horribly afraid of being ruled by his wife.”
- Julia Merrington: Her husband, Edward Calvert, has died three years prior and “left me penniless and burthened with the care of two children.” She now works as a teacher.
- Fanny Stanley: Fanny's letter is overwhelmed by the questions and misbehaving of her six children, who claw for the paper and spill ink on her work. It ends with “the children are calling me, and baby is crying at the height of his voice; so in haste, adieu.”
- Annie Hamilton: Annie discusses a short story she has recently finished reading by Honoré de Balzac. The plot is strikingly similar to Annie's predicament: Balzac's Julie has been asked to describe, through letter, her marriage with a “M. le Colonel.” Julie's description is “ever miserable … the picture was far from flattering to the male sex in general.” Just after Julie finishes her letter, M. le Colonel's aunt enters and reads her work. Her aunt's response, which Annie paraphrases in French, is translated thus: "My little girl, a married woman cannot write such a letter as this to a young unmarried woman; it is scarcely proper. If a dish at table is not to our taste, there is no occasion to disgust others with it, child, especially when marriage has seemed to us all, from Eve downwards, so excellent an institution." Julie throws her letter into a fire. Annie admits to Caroline she has now failed to describe her marriage as promised. Per their signed contract, she promises to send Caroline a diamond solitaire, which “may, perchance, prove a wedding gift.”

Having received all six grave responses, Caroline, now “perplexed, tormented, saddened, [and] uncertain what to do,” asks her sister-in-law Dora Bloomfield for advice. Dora provides an unvarnished truth:

To remain single, my dearest Carry, is all very well so long as, young and beautiful, you have shoals of admirers and crowds of friends;but in ten or fifteen years from now, with your circles scattered, yourself wearied of out-door amusements, your contemporaries grown old, and retiring, day by day, more into their own shells and houses, you will find yourself alone, and shut out from many privileges. No one depends upon you; no life, no happiness is twined closely with your own.

Dora places pen and paper before Caroline, and commands her to write her final decision to Edward. In an act of fortuitous dramatic timing, Edward, along with Caroline's mother and brother, enters into the room. Caroline rises to meet them, but Dora speaks first: “Your own hand has penned the answer, my uncertain and doubting sister. While I was delivering my long peroration, your trembling fingers have first written on Annie Atherton’s letter, ‘Dearest Edward,’ and then, ‘Mrs. Edward Allingham.’ I proclaim our blushing Caroline wooed and won.”

All parties embrace, and “so ends the tableau and this history.”

== Themes & Analysis ==
=== Northern Versus Southern Women ===
Juxtaposed against the weaknesses of its six Southern writer-wives, "Old Maidism Versus Marriage"'s strongest voice is Dora Bloomfield, the Northern sister-in-law of Caroline. Her monologue on marriage occupies three pages, the end of which includes a biting attack on Southern matrons: "Southern women are apt to be either slaves or tyrants; and themselves aid in making their husbands despots or Jerry Sneaks. They have such a trick of losing their own individuality in the imposing grandeur of the 'he' and 'him' who is the arbiter of their destiny." While each Southern woman appears burdened by marriage, Dora looks "small and graceful as a fairy, and pretty as a dream, exquisitely dressed, with a certain set about her whole person and attire that spoke the admired belle." Dora bears no marks of weariness or poverty. Her proffered playthings towards her infant son, Jim, suggest an overabundance of wealth: first Dora "flung him her embroidered handkerchief to tear to pieces," then she is seen "loosing a gorgeous bracelet from her wrist." Dora's characterization, behavior, and wisdom complement a brief earlier description of a party scene, in Part II, wherein a "witty Northern belle, of course, attracted the most attention."

King herself took several extended trips North (including her education in Philadelphia as a young girl), and expressed her dislike for the South and its "stupid, self-sufficient, wearisome styles of [its] young ladies ... who have not three ideas, who spoil a little French, who play a little music, and have not a grain of agreeability." Contrary to common beliefs of Southern pride created by 19th-century political conflicts, King, never a politic, saw the North as feminist safe haven, where she could escape from her disintegrating marriage and her domestic and child-rearing responsibilities, and pursue more openly her attractions to other men. New York City, in particular, was a place King felt she could "take a peep out of our confined limits [and] ... spread my wings ever so little," a possibility which seemed "so utterly unrealizable" in Charleston.

=== French Language ===
The over-abundance of untranslated French in King's work is intriguing, considering her early education at Madame Talvande's in Charleston. Young King chafed against the requirement of constant French in both instructional and conversational dialogue, where she was commanded to "Parlez Francais Mademoiselle vous parlez toujours Anglais" ("you always speak English, you must speak French"). In her later life, however, King avidly read French literature, particularly contemporary French female novelist and fellow-iconoclast George Sand. She translated four French short stories for Russell's Magazine, and later worked as a foreign-language clerk in the Washington Post Office.

=== Biographical Allusions ===
For additional Petigru family history and references, see James L. Petigru

The problems of "Old Maidism Versus Marriage"'s six writer-wives are reflected repeatedly in both King's immediate and extended family. Her aunt Adèle Theresa Allston, like Fanny, had nine children over twenty years. Aunt Jane Gilbert North, like Julia, was left widowed and impoverished by the death of her husband, and also turned to teaching. Uncle Jack Petigru, like Louise's husband, moved West and struggled under poverty. Aunt Mary Petigru, like Laura, felt isolated on her rural farm and unappreciated by brother James. Sister Caroline Carson, like Adelaide, found her artistic abilities stunted by a verbally (and for Caroline, physically) abusive husband.

None of the characters are necessarily direct translations of real people (although her family's views on King's writing suggests otherwise), but they rather represent the larger spectrum of social dysfunction occurring in early-to-mid 19th-century Charleston. The inherent encouragement of domestic violence by the South's system of slavery, coupled with Charleston's economic decline throughout the 19th-century, produced marriages marked by financial ruin, strained relationships, slave affairs, substance abuse, and spousal abuse. King, in childhood and adulthood, directly experienced all five of these tribulations.

=== Early Realism ===
"Old Maidism," to use a turn of phrase, lifts the veil from the myth of the blissful plantation housewife espoused in Antebellum Charleston society to complicate and confuse its young female readership. The misery of each writer-wife's account is juxtaposed against Caroline's memories of their earlier, premarital optimism and excitement. Yet King's women are not martyrs or heroes; each woman soldiers on, miserable but complacent in their state. The final conclusion - Caroline's decision to marry - does not preclude a happy ending, but only the possibility of happiness if, according to Dora Bloomfield, she learns to "'bear and forbear;' 'yield and yield.'" The level of detail contained in King's descriptions, the similarities to King's family history, and the textual nod to early realist Balzac each indicate a developing sense of realism within King's first book.

Explicit endorsements of realism in King's later work reinforces this interpretation. In "The Best of Friends," a short story from Sylvia's World/Crimes Which the Law Does Not Reach, King rails against the ideology of a sentimental society. King writes:

I have seen good called evil, and evil, good. I have seen virtue do vicious acts, and I have seen poor vice perform the highest and noblest works. I have seen the unkindest people applauded for their wonderful charity, and I have seen the warmest hearts crushed because they were misunderstood - in a word, I have seen the great spirit of ‘humbug’ which governs society, ride triumphant over honesty and sincerity, and I have long come to the conclusion that the earth would be a fair pace to dwell in, if it were not for the men and women that inhabit it.

In Lily: A Novel, King again addresses her dislike of sentimental novels - specifically their portrayals of young women. King writes:

Dickens has a great deal to answer for in inventing Little Nell, for his imitators have since flooded the world with a host of "serious girls," and "prayerful babies," and unnatural infants generally, which will soon induce the readers and admirers of such tales to fancy that, after sixteen years of age, life ends instead of beginning. Little people who can scarcely talk lisp Methodist sermons, and argue with their elders, and show judgment, tact, and energy which invariably throw into contempt the strongest efforts in the same line of all grown men and women. In fact, their labors are superhuman. They bake, wash, and brew - educate, and care for their fathers, mothers, grandmothers, and grandfathers, to the remotest generation, and naturally, after all this, die of extreme old age at fifteen or thereabouts, leaving behind them reputations of unparalleled magnitude. Their conversations are of the deepest theological research, though, for the most part, a little ungrammatical; and, in short, were I capable of portraying such monsters, "which the world ne'er saw," my book would always lack one important reader - myself.

== Critical reception ==
The few contemporary critical reviews of Busy Moments are generally positive, if a little taken aback by King's revealing descriptions of dress and suggestions of moral ambiguity. A critic from the Southern Quarterly Review called it "decidedly a clever book ... The Authoress is a true woman – her eye never fails to take in at a glance the whole dress of every lady she meets, and she reports it with, perhaps, rather too much detail.". According to literary historian J.R. Scafidel, Busy Moments was "praised lavishly" in The Charleston Daily Courier for its "wit and sophistication." In a review of Lily: A Novel, a critic from The Charleston Mercury remembered Busy Moments for portraying "the outer aspects of fashionable society with grace and spirit." Modern critical explorations of Busy Moments have tended to focus on two issues: intertextual comparisons to the more conventional sentimental narrative of the book's novella, "Edith," or interpretations of the aged Mrs. Mordaunt from "An Every-Day Life," seen as the first example of King's older, mentor-woman characters. Sandra Barrett Moore's 2002 doctoral dissertation examined how "Old Maidism" develops a theme of "Northern Versus Southern Women." Scafidel's 1975 essay on Sue King's use of realism praised "Old Maidism" for its "realistic, unsentimental look at one of the institutions of society."

An interesting non-critical response occurred on the campus of the South Carolina Collegiate Institute, when "influenced by a recently published short story, a group of Carolina schoolmates planned a five-year reunion from which those who had married would not only be barred, but be compelled to submit written descriptions of what their lives had become 'as wives or widows' and to lay bare "the secrets of [their] prison house[s]."
