= Thomas Smith Grimké =

American politician (1786–1834)

Thomas Smith Grimké LL.D.
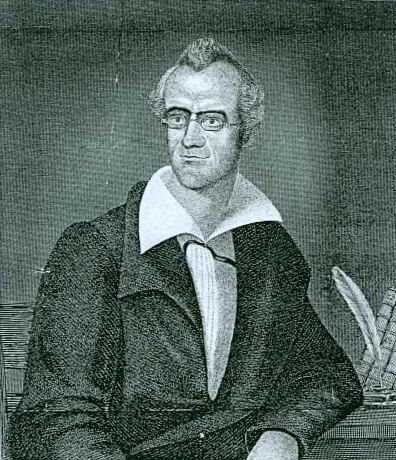
- Born: September 22, 1786; Charleston, South Carolina
- Died: October 12, 1834 (aged 48); Columbus, Ohio
- Burial place: Green Lawn Cemetery
- Education: Charleston College; Yale College
- Spouse: Sarah Daniel Drayton (m. 1810)
- Father: John Faucheraud Grimké
- Relatives: Sarah Moore Grimké (sister); Angelina Grimké Weld (sister); Frederick Grimke (brother); Archibald Grimké (nephew); Francis James Grimké (nephew)

Thomas Smith Grimké (September 22, 1786 – October 12, 1834) was an American attorney, author, orator, and social activist. Among his siblings were the Grimké sisters.

== Parents and education ==
Thomas Grimké was the second of fourteen children borne to jurist John Faucheraud Grimké, and Mary ("Polly"), daughter of Thomas and Sarah (Moore) Smith, of Charleston, South Carolina. He graduated from Charleston College, and entered the study of law under John Julius Pringle, then Attorney General of South Carolina, in 1804. He suspended his legal studies to enter Yale College in the fall of 1805. After completing courses at Yale, Grimké expressed a desire to prepare for the ministry, but yielded to the wishes of his jurist father and was admitted to the bar in May 1809. Grimké practiced law in Charleston, South Carolina. In 1830, Grimké received an honorary degree of Doctor of Laws from Yale.

== Legal career ==
On March 17, 1827, Grimké advocated, in an address before the Bar Association of South Carolina, the codification of the laws of that state. He was a member of the State Senate in 1826–1830, and in 1828 made a speech in support of the federal government on the tariff question.

Grimké had a distinguished career in the South Carolina courts. He is perhaps best known for the case of M'Cready v. Hunt, focusing on states' rights, which was brought before the South Carolina Court of Appeals in 1834. The case involved a "test oath" passed by the South Carolina legislature in November 1832. The oath required that members of the state militia pledge "faithful and true allegiance" to the State of South Carolina. The law was vague on the underlying and contentious issue of sovereignty, and did not specifically state whether allegiance to the state was superior to allegiance to the federal government. However, dispute over the oath immediately erupted. The "Nullifier" faction asserted that allegiance to states had precedence over allegiance to the federal government, while "Unionists", with Grimké in the lead, asserted that the federal government had primacy over all states.

Eventually, a legal case on the validity of the test oath reached the state Court of Appeals in Columbia. Attorney Robert Barnwell Rhett, of Beaufort, argued for the test oath with the support of state Governor Robert Y. Hayne. He was opposed by a trio of young Unionist attorneys, James L. Petigru of Charleston, business attorney Abram Blanding of Columbia, and Grimké. The decision on June 2, 1834 from the three judges fell 2 to 1 for the Unionists. "Nullifiers" immediately called for the impeachment of the two jurists. "Nullifier" legislators responded to the decision by calling for a constitutional amendment to legalize the test oath and assert the primacy of allegiance to South Carolina.

== Social activism ==
Grimké was an active advocate and donor to the temperance movement and a prominent member of the American Peace Society. He was active in forming a South Carolina chapter of the American Colonization Society, which endeavored to send free blacks to Africa, to what would become Liberia.

He was also an advocate and lecturer upon the reformation of education in America, particularly urging the use of the Bible as a textbook in schools. Though a fine classical scholar, he opposed both classics and mathematics as elements of an education. He was an early advocate of spelling reform, as a means of simplifying education, and used his original spelling method in his own publications after 1833. Grimké was elected a member of the American Antiquarian Society in 1833.

He advocated absolute non-violence, holding that even self-defensive warfare was wicked. When asked what he would do if he were mayor of Charleston, and a piratical vessel should attack the city, he is said to have replied that he would marshal the Sunday-school children in procession, and lead them to meet the invader, which caused his ideas to be met with much ridicule.

== Family ==
The Grimké family were German by descent, and his paternal grandmother's family was French Huguenot. On January 25, 1810, he married Sarah Daniel Drayton of Charleston, who died on July 23, 1867. The couple had six sons. His siblings included the noted orators and abolitionists Sarah Moore Grimké and Angelina Grimké Weld. His brother and law partner Henry W. Grimké was the father of children by an enslaved woman. Although he did not free them, Angelina and Sarah helped them once they became aware of the sons' existence: Archibald Grimké became a journalist and diplomat, and Francis J. Grimké, a Presbyterian minister. Frederick Grimké (1791–1863), another brother, was for some time presiding judge of the Ohio Court of Common Pleas, and from 1836 to 1842 was a member of the Ohio Supreme Court, from which he resigned to devote his time to "philosophical studies".

== Death ==
Grimké died of cholera on October 12, 1834, while on a lecture tour and a visit with family members in Ohio. He was buried in Columbus, Ohio. He received a 3-page obituary in the African Repository and Colonial Journal, including material from "a Charleston paper", which communicated that in his honor, members of the Charleston bar would wear mourning (black) for 30 days. A sermon preached in Charleston on the occasion of his death was subsequently printed in the Episcopal publication Gospel Messenger (volume 11, December, 1834).

The contemporary doctor Daniel Drake remembered him in these terms:

It may be trule said of Mr.G. that he was a Christian scholar, a Christian orator, a Christian philosopher, and a Christian gentleman. He had resolved the whole duty of man, in every situation and relation of life, into the simple and sublime principple of obedience to God, and was himself a luminious example of conformity, in practice, to his own theory of moral obligation. The preservation of the Union was one of his cherished themes...

== See also ==
- Nullification Crisis of 1832
- South Carolina Court of Appeals
