= Leila Amos Pendleton =

African-American community activist and teacher (1868–1938)

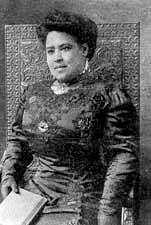
- Frontispiece of A Narrative of the Negro
- Born: 1868; Washington, D.C., U.S.
- Died: December 7, 1938 (aged 69–70); Washington, D.C., U.S.
- Occupations: Author, community activist and teacher
- Notable work: A Narrative of the Negro (1912)
- Spouse: Robert Lewis Pendleton (m. 1893)

Leila Amos Pendleton (1868 – December 7, 1938) was an author, community activist, and a teacher in Washington D.C.'s public schools. She was the founder and president of the Alpha Charity Club of Anacostia and the Social Purity Club of Washington, D.C. She was active in several other women's race organizations, both as a secretary and vice president. She wrote books and articles. She was African-American. Her husband, Robert Lewis Pendleton (1865–1929) was a publisher and printer. He published some of his wife's books, historical statements of African Americans, and community publications including the Constitution of the American Negro Academy for the American Negro Academy of Washington, D.C. in 1905.

== Early life ==
Leila Amos Pendleton was born in 1868 in Washington, D.C. She went to Washington public, high, and normal schools. In 1893, she married Robert Lewis Pendleton. Her father was Joseph Ferdinand Amos and her mother was Maria Louise Bruce. Her father was a policeman for 30 years. She had five brothers: James E., Ralph W., Ferdinand F., Ernest R., and Claude B. Amos.

== Career ==
Pendleton was a strong influence in her community. As a community activist, she dedicated herself to the improvement of African Americans through children's education. Based on her personal experiences as an educator and activist, she wrote A Narrative of the Negro, published in 1912. The work was well-received and led some to consider her to be the first black woman historian.

She considered this book, which offers a comprehensive and readable history of blacks in Africa, the Caribbean, and the United States, to be one of her most noteworthy accomplishments. She describes the book in the preface as a “sort of ‘family story’ to the colored children of America." The primary audience for her book was African-American schoolchildren, a group that was largely unschooled about the accomplishments of African people and their descendants. Pendleton did her research at the Library of Congress, the Boston Public Library and the libraries of Yale and Harvard. She also wrote An Alphabet for Negro Children, Frederick Douglass: A Narrative, and two stories for children that were published in The Crisis, the official magazine of the National Association for the Advancement of Colored People (NAACP), founded in 1910.

== Published works ==
Pendleton’s most famous work is her school textbook, entitled A Narrative of the Negro (1971), which was used as a textbook in Washington, D.C., public schools. This textbook is under a chronological order where it starts with the African American history in ancient Africa to the early 1900. The textbook's first seven chapters is towards the study of the African Diaspora, focusing much on Africa, the Caribbean, and South America. The next 15 chapters focused on African-American history, and are followed by colonial history and a section dedicated to the events shaping the early 20th century. Pendleton also emphasized the many White allies who had assisted African Americans through oppressive moments in history. She wrote positively of the Quakers William Lloyd Garrison and George Peabody, with balanced narratives concerning White oppression with White advocacy.

One way that Pendleton challenged the morality of White people was through the discourse of slavery. According to the dominant narrative, slavery was seen as a system to help "civilize" Black people and to support this ideology, religion was used as justification. Pendleton's narratives showed acts of resistance that exemplified African Americans' unhappiness toward slavery. Pendleton provided several examples of how African Americans used the judicial system to dismantle slavery.

Besides that, in her Narrative, she included that the African-American soldier is symbolic because a soldier represented a type of citizenship that had been traditionally excluded and who were civic contributors to American democracy. Pendleton expressed that although African Americans were initially not accepted as soldiers, once they were permitted, they were loyal and willing participants to die for freedom. Pendleton's gender amplified her influence due to her presentation of Black women in the public imagination and K-12 schools. A Narrative of the Negro was written specifically for "all the colored children" in classrooms to celebrate their history and culture.

Pendleton's other works, included An Alphabet for Negro Children (Mather, 1915), Our New Possession-The Danish West Indies (1917), a published autobiography about Frederick Douglass (1921a), and two short stories published in The Crisis magazine, "The Foolish and the Wise: Sallie Runner is Introduced to Socrates" (1921b) and "The Foolish and the Wise: Sanctum 777NS.D.C.U.O. Meets Cleopatra" (1922). In "The Foolish and the Wise", through Sallie (the main character), Pendleton show[ed] how white people have presumed to "own" not only human beings, but all significant human attainments, and have complacently assumed that anyone who achieves a great deal must, as a matter of course, be white.

=== A Narrative of the Negro, 1912 ===
(14 editions published between 1912 and 2012 in English)

Pendleton describes A Narrative of the Negro as a volume that "contains, in story form, a brief outline of the history of the Negro". This 22-chapter book presents the history of Africans and their decedents in a chronological order. Pendleton starts from describing the geographical conditions and natural resources of the African continent, and then she goes from the early African civilizations to the terms slavery in Europe and Americas, and eventually to the African Americans in her contemporaries. In A Narrative of the Negro, Pendleton's approach to history is described as "multidimensional", different from the stereotypical views on Africans and their descendants from traditional history textbooks at the time.

=== Frederick Douglass: A Narrative, 1921 ===
(2 editions published in 1921 in English)

In the book Frederick Douglas: A Narrative, Leila Amos Pendleton, as a narrator, provides a survey of Frederick Douglass's life, including his early life as a slave, his escape from slavery and his career as an abolitionist.

=== Fragments of Rhyme, 1921 ===
(1 edition published in 1921 in English)

=== Publications on The Crisis magazine ===
"An Apostrophe to the Lynched", June 1916 (Volume 12, No. 2).

"The Foolish and the Wise", March 1921 (Volume 21, No. 5).

== Death ==
She died at her home in Washington, D.C., on December 7, 1938.

== Notes ==
A summary of A Narrative of the Negro is provided at Bartles, Erin. Summary, A Narrative of the Negro]
