= Nathaniel Reed =

Nathaniel Reed may refer to:

- Nathaniel C. Reed (c. 1810–1853), Ohio Supreme Court justice
- Nathaniel Reed (outlaw) (1862–1950), 19th-century American outlaw
- Nathaniel Reed (environmentalist) (1933–2018), American environmentalist and political aide

== See also ==
- Nathan Reed, a minor character on Angel
