= Frederick Grimke =

American judge

Judge of the Ohio Supreme Court
- In office January 30, 1836 – March 2, 1842
- Preceded by: Joshua Collett
- Succeeded by: Nathaniel C. Reed

Personal details
- Born: September 1, 1791 Charleston, South Carolina, US
- Died: March 8, 1863 (aged 71) Chillicothe, Ohio, US
- Resting place: Grandview Cemetery

Frederick Grimke (September 1, 1791 – March 8, 1863) was a judge and writer in the U.S. State of Ohio who served on the Ohio Supreme Court from 1836 to 1842.

== Biography ==
Frederick Grimke was born in Charleston, South Carolina, a son of John Faucheraud Grimké, a Revolutionary War hero and jurist in that state, and a major slaveholder. Frederick would later drop the accent from this last name. His siblings included the Grimké sisters, whose antislavery views he did not share, the attorney Thomas Smith Grimké, and Henry W. Grimké, father of the African-American leaders Archibald Grimké and Francis J. Grimké. Frederick graduated from Yale University at age 19, studied law in South Carolina, and practiced in that state before moving to Chillicothe, Ohio in 1818.

From 1820 to 1836, Grimke was President Judge of the Court of Common Pleas. In 1836, he was elected a Judge on the Ohio Supreme Court. Throughout this time he wrote essays for the Scioto Gazette (Chillicothe) and Ohio State Journal (Columbus). In 1842, literary and philosophical studies became an obsession, and he resigned from the Supreme Court.

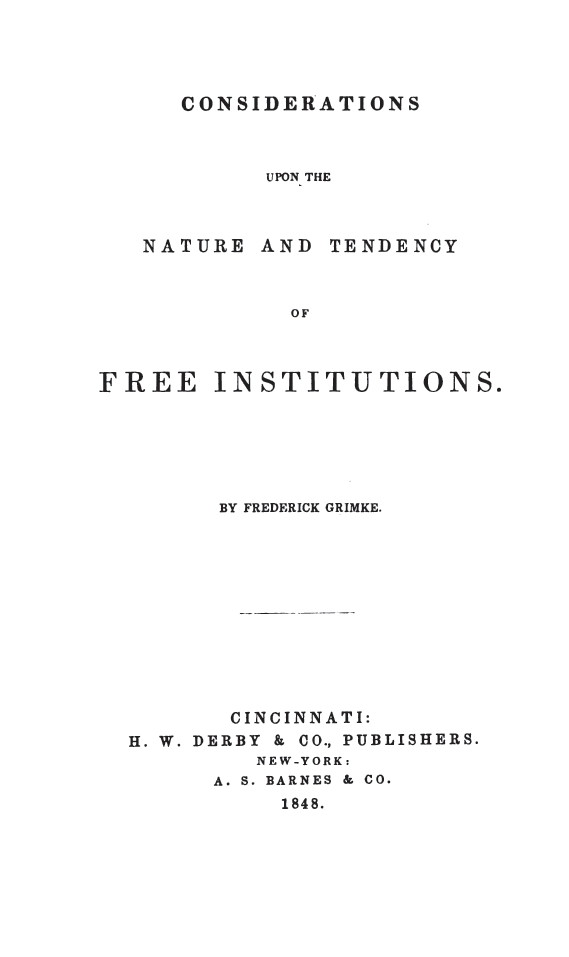
title page of Grimke's book

In 1848, Grimke published his Considerations upon the Nature and Tendency of Free Institutions. The historian Richard Hofstadter has described it as deserving "a place among the more important books of nineteenth-century political speculation," for its analysis of two-party political conflict. Before he died during the American Civil War, he directed that one copy be delivered to the Federal Government, and one to the Confederate Government. He also published Essay on Ancient and Modern Literature, where he came out firmly in favor of the modern over the Classics. Grimke also wrote an unpublished manuscript advocating in favor of equal rights for women. It was published posthumously as The Rights of Women in a Democratic Republic.

Grimke died March 8, 1863 at his bachelor quarters at the Madeira House in Chillicothe, and it was said that when he was moved from there to the grave, not one woman followed his remains to his resting place. He was interred at Grandview Cemetery (Chillicothe, Ohio).

== Honors ==
- Elected a member of the American Antiquarian Society in 1836.

== Publications ==
- Grimke, Frederick (1848). Considerations upon the Nature and Tendency of Free Institutions. Cincinnati: H W Derby and Company.
