= Jacob Burnet =

American judge (1770–1853)

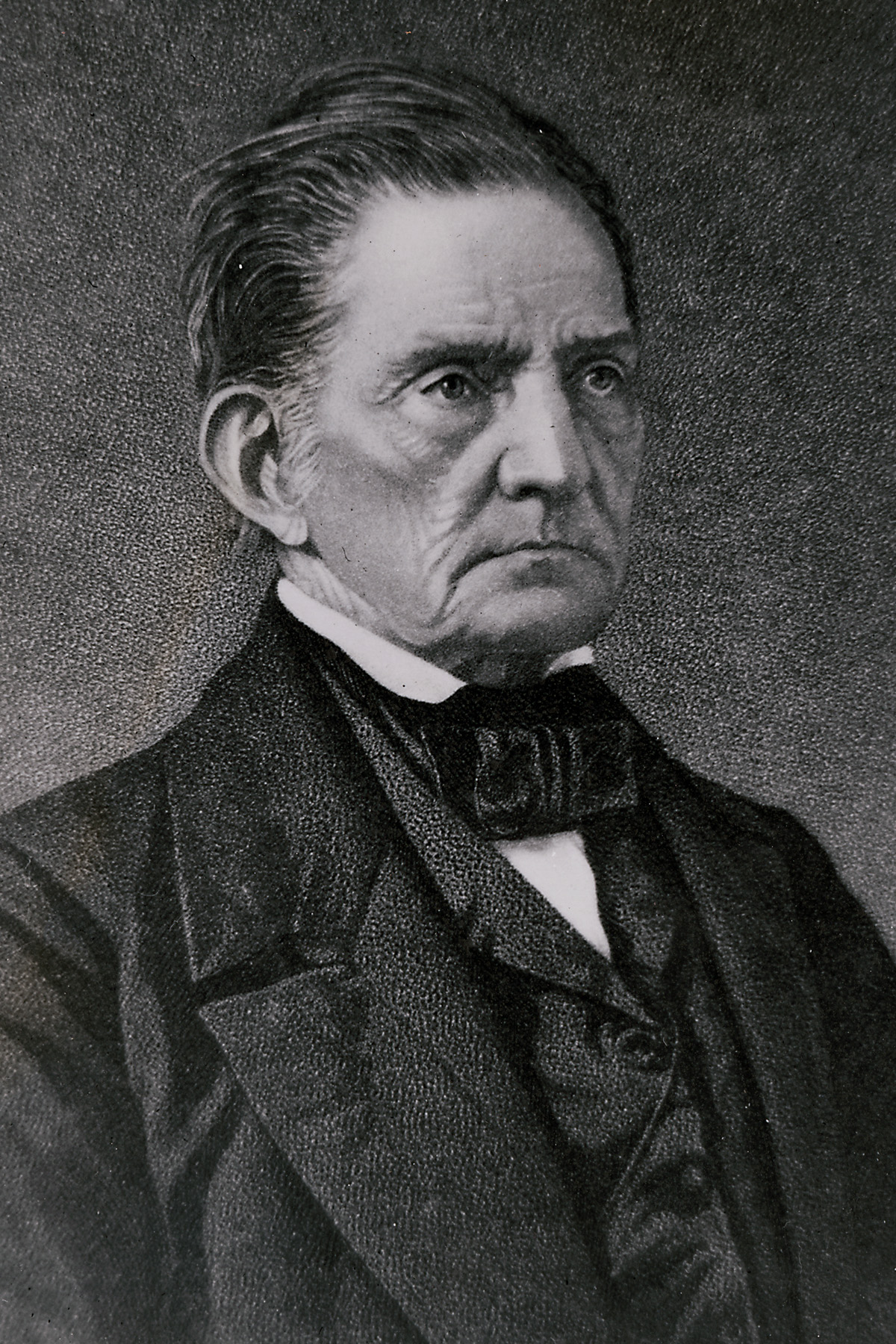

United States Senator from Ohio
- In office December 10, 1828 – March 3, 1831
- Preceded by: William Henry Harrison
- Succeeded by: Thomas Ewing

Justice of the Ohio Supreme Court
- In office 1821 – December 11, 1828
- Appointed by: Ethan Allen Brown
- Preceded by: Jessup Nash Couch
- Succeeded by: Joshua Collett

Member of the Ohio House of Representatives from Hamilton County
- In office 1814–1816
- Preceded by: Peter Bell; Ephraim Brown; Zebulon Foster
- Succeeded by: Arthur Henry; Daniel Hosbrook; Benjamin M. Platt

Personal details
- Born: February 22, 1770 Newark, New Jersey
- Died: May 10, 1853 (aged 83) Cincinnati, Ohio
- Resting place: Spring Grove Cemetery; Cincinnati, Ohio
- Party: Adams; Anti-Jacksonian
- Relations: David G. Burnet
- Parent: William Burnet
- Education: College of New Jersey

Jacob Burnet (sometimes spelled Burnett) (February 22, 1770 – May 10, 1853) was an American jurist and statesman from Ohio. He served as a U.S. senator.

== Early life ==
Burnet was born in Newark, New Jersey, the son of Dr. William Burnet. He graduated from the College of New Jersey in 1791, studied law, moved to the Northwest Territory and settled in Cincinnati in 1796. He was admitted to the bar in 1796.

== Political career ==
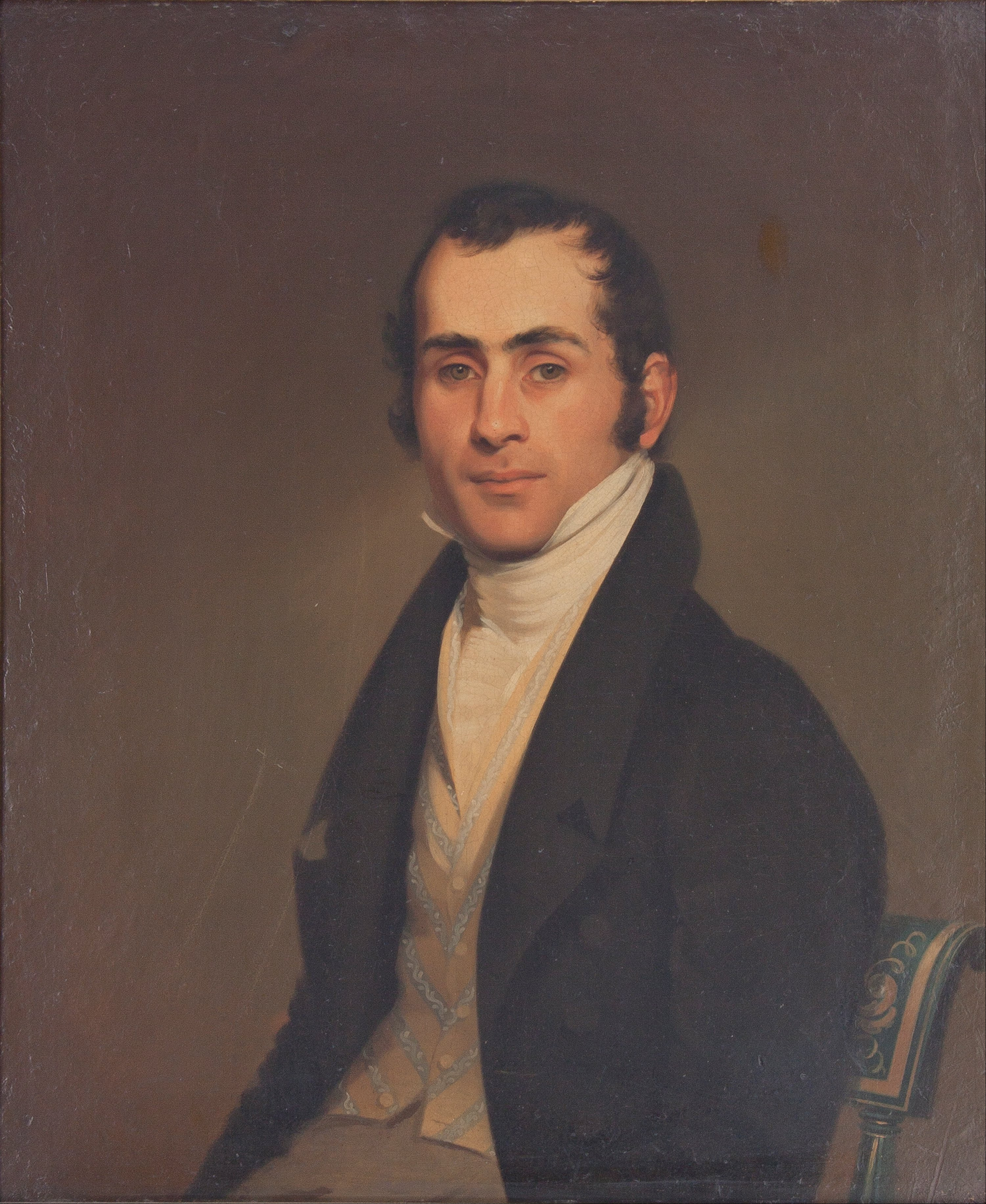
Jacob Burnet

He was a member of the Territorial councils of Ohio from 1799 to 1802 and served in the Ohio State House from 1814 to 1816. Burnet was considered the "father of the Ohio constitution" and was an associate justice of the Ohio Supreme Court from 1821 until his resignation in 1828 to serve as United States Senator. He was elected to the U.S. Senate to fill the vacancy caused by the resignation of William Henry Harrison. He served in the Senate from December 10, 1828, to March 3, 1831.

Burnet was elected a member of the American Antiquarian Society in 1815.

After leaving Congress, he resumed the practice of law and served as president of Cincinnati College and the Medical College of Ohio. Burnet's "Notes on the Early Settlement of the North-western Territory" is a primary reference on the early Northwest.

He resided in a mansion on the northwest corner of Seventh and Elm streets in Downtown Cincinnati. Burnet died in Cincinnati on May 10, 1853, aged 83. He is interred in Spring Grove Cemetery in Cincinnati.

== Family life ==
Burnet's half-brother David G. Burnet was the first president of the Republic of Texas.

== Notes ==
Political offices
New title	Speaker of the Northwest Territory Legislative Council; 1799–1802	Ohio statehood
Assembly seats
New district	Member of the Northwest Territory Legislative Council from Hamilton County; 1799–1802; Served alongside: James Findlay	Ohio statehood
Ohio House of Representatives
Preceded by Peter Bell; Ephraim Brown; Zebulon Foster	Representative from Hamilton County; 1814–1816; Served alongside: Peter Bell, Ephraim Brown	Succeeded by Arthur Henry; Daniel Hosbrook; Benjamin M. Platt
U.S. Senate
Preceded by William Henry Harrison	U.S. senator (Class 3) from Ohio; December 10, 1828 – March 3, 1831; Served alongside: Benjamin Ruggles	Succeeded by Thomas Ewing
Legal offices
Preceded by Jessup Nash Couch	Ohio Supreme Court Judge; 1821–1828	Succeeded by Joshua Collett
