= William Burnet (physician) =

American politician

2nd President of the Medical Society of New Jersey
- In office 1767–1768
- Preceded by: Robert McKean
- Succeeded by: John Cochran

Personal details
- Born: December 13, 1730 Elizabeth, New Jersey
- Died: October 7, 1791 (aged 60) Newark, New Jersey, US

William Burnet (December 13, 1730 – October 7, 1791) was an American political leader and physician from New Jersey. He served in the Continental Army and the Continental Congress.

== Biography ==
He was born on December 13, 1730, in Elizabeth, New Jersey.

Burnet graduated from Princeton University in 1749, studied medicine under Dr. Staats in White Plains, New York, and started his practice in Newark, New Jersey. He was a member of Newark's Committee of Safety in 1775 before he joined the Continental Army as a surgeon. He opened a hospital in Newark for wounded soldiers, and ran it throughout the Revolution. He was appointed Surgeon General for the Eastern Region in 1776, and also held that position until the war ended in 1783.

Burnet was elected to the Continental Congress in 1780 and served from December 11, 1780, until his resignation on April 1, 1781, when he was forced to leave this service by the press of other duties and his wife's illness. Later that year he began serving as a judge in Essex County. He also led the New Jersey Medical Society in 1787. He was a member of The Society of the Cincinnati in the state of New Jersey, taking the seat of his brother Ichabod upon his death. He died in Newark, New Jersey, on October 7, 1791, aged 60, and was interred in that city's First Presbyterian Church Cemetery.

== Family ==
He married Mary Camp (1731–1781) and raised a large and successful family. Among his sons by his first wife Jacob Burnet was later a United States Senator from Ohio, while Ichabod and William, Jr. followed their father as doctors. With his second wife, Gertrude Gouverneur Rutgers, the widow of Anthony A. Rutgers (a brother of Henry Rutgers who founded Rutgers University), Burnet had three more sons. Isaac G. Burnet served as mayor of Cincinnati, and his youngest son, David Gouverneur Burnet, played a prominent role in Texas's struggle for independence.
