= Andrew Harris (abolitionist) =

American abolitionist and minister (1814–1841)

- Born: 1814; New York, U.S.
- Died: December 1, 1841 (aged 26–27); Philadelphia, U.S.
- Education: University of Vermont
- Occupations: Minister, abolitionist

Andrew Harris (1814 – December 1, 1841) was an American abolitionist, minister, and the first African-American graduate of the University of Vermont (class of 1838). He was one of the first African Americans to receive a college degree in the United States and the first to champion abolition of slavery and full racial equality.

== Early life and education ==
Harris was born in 1814 to African American parents in New York State. His mother may have been only 12 years old when she gave birth to him. As an infant, Harris was adopted by a white couple (a Presbyterian minister and a homemaker) in Cayuga, New York, in the Finger Lakes region. Harris attended the Geneva Lyceum, a college and ministry preparatory school. Wishing to become a minister, he sought admittance to Union College and Middlebury College, both of which rejected his applications, and then to the University of Vermont, which accepted him as its first Black student, probably at the behest of UVM president John Wheeler. Harris matriculated in November 1835 as a member of the class of 1838.

Harris earned good grades and graduated from the University of Vermont on time in July 1838, ranking fourteenth in his class of twenty-four students. While a successful student, he experienced ostracism and overt racism from most classmates. Students barred him from participating in clubs, attending chapel, or speaking or appearing on stage at graduation. Administrators were complicit in this conduct, as Harris's name was omitted from catalogues of students during the 1830s, and most student examination records listed him last, whereas all other students were listed alphabetically.

== Clerical career and abolitionism ==
Straying from Burlington, Vermont, during the winter of 1836–1837, Harris found work and community in Troy, New York. He taught at a Black school, served as secretary of a local African American reform society, spoke at a racially integrated meeting of the local Female Benevolent Society, and acted as secretary of a “Union Meeting of the Colored People of Albany, Troy and Vicinity," calling for collective action among the Capital Region's African Americans. Harris's lectures and sermons stressed education, temperance, moral conduct, and self-improvement among African Americans.

After graduation, Harris moved to New York City and then to Philadelphia, where he quickly became a prominent activist and speaker in African American and abolitionist circles and befriended Daniel Alexander Payne and Theodore S. Wright. On May 7, 1839, he spoke at the American Anti-Slavery Society annual meeting. His address was reprinted in The Emancipator and received high praise from abolitionists of all races. A delegate to the first convention of the Liberty Party, Harris supported political action to end slavery and opposed the resettlement of African Americans in Liberia. He was ordained a minister on April 15, 1841, and assumed pastoral duties for the Second African Presbyterian Church on St. Mary Street in Philadelphia.

Harris's promising career as a clergyman and activist was cut short when he fell ill with a fever in November 1841 and died on December 1, 1841, at the age of 27. His obituary ran in about a dozen newspapers across Pennsylvania, New York, and New England, including The Liberator, The Colored American, The Philadelphia Inquirer, the Rochester Daily Democrat, the Boston Atlas, and the New-York Commercial Advertiser.

== Legacy at UVM ==
The University of Vermont recognized Harris as its first Black graduate in 2014 (prior to 2004, George Washington Henderson was believed to have been the university's first Black graduate). In 2015, the Vermont Division for Historic Preservation placed a historical marker dedicated to Harris on the UVM campus in Burlington. Criticized for initially placing the marker in low-traffic locations on campus, UVM moved the marker to the exterior of the Dudley H. Davis Center. In 2018, UVM established the Andrew Harris Commons, an open-air campus space with marble monuments in Harris's honor. In addition, UVM has established the Andrew Harris Scholarship to support students of color and the Andrew Harris Fellowship to support faculty of color.
