= George Washington Henderson =

American theologian and professor (1850–1936)

George Henderson
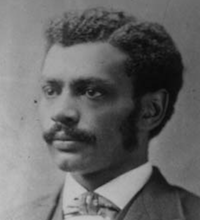
- Born: George Washington Henderson; November 16, 1850; Clarke County, Virginia
- Died: February 6, 1936 (aged 85); Xenia, Ohio
- Occupation(s): Theologian and professor
- Spouses: Hattie Eliza Gage (m. 1884; died 1886) Mary Virginia Harris (m. 1889)
- Children: 1

Reverend George Washington Henderson (November 16, 1850 – February 6, 1936) was an American theologian and professor, known for being the first Black member of Phi Beta Kappa.

== Early life and education ==
Henderson was born enslaved in Clarke County, Virginia, on November 11, 1850. He was the son of George Vincent Henderson (b. 1828) and Harriet A. (Macy) Henderson. He became the servant of a Vermont Infantry officer, possibly Zephaniah Carpenter, and moved with him to Underhill, Vermont after the Civil War.

Henderson arrived in Vermont unable to read or write but attended Underhill Academy where he received intensive tutoring from the principal, as well as Barre Academy, receiving his diploma in 1873. He graduated first in his class in 1877 from the University of Vermont, having completed his studies in three years since he was working as principal of Jericho Academy during what would have been his junior year. Henderson's commencement speech was entitled "The Economy of Moral Forces in History." He was inducted in Phi Beta Kappa that same year. Henderson completed a master's degree at UVM in 1880 and a Bachelor's of Divinity from Yale University in 1883. He received a Hooker Fellowship and studied in Berlin. He was UVM's second African American graduate, after Andrew Harris of the class of 1838. UVM awarded him an Honorary Doctor of Divinity degree in 1896. He was elected to the American Negro Academy but was only able to serve for three years because of his involvement with civil rights work.

== Career ==
Henderson worked as principal of multiple schools in Vermont including Jericho Academy, Craftsbury Academy, and Newport Graded School. After leaving Vermont in 1883, he became pastor of the Central Congregational Church in New Orleans. In 1890 he became chair of the department of theology at Straight University, a position he held for fourteen years. He was Dean of Theology at Fisk University in Nashville, Tennessee from 1904 to 1909 after which he moved to Xenia, Ohio where he was professor of Latin, Greek, and Ancient Literature at Wilberforce University for the rest of his career, retiring in 1932.

Henderson wrote "First Memorial Against Lynching" in 1894 which he sent to the Louisiana legislature. It was the first formal protest against lynching in the United States. He also wrote a pamphlet documenting the actions of black soldiers during the Spanish–American War which was the only contemporary account written of these soldiers. He was the editor of the homiletical department of the A. M. E. Review.

== Family and legacy ==
Henderson was married twice. His first wife Hattie Eliza Gage worked at Craftsbury Academy while he was principal. They married August 18, 1884. She died of complications from childbirth on March 22, 1886. They had one child, Willard Atwood Henderson who died of consumption on November 29, 1886. Henderson married his second wife, Mary Virginia Harris, of New Orleans on April 2, 1889.

Henderson died on February 3, 1936, and is buried in Cherry Grove Cemetery, Xenia, Ohio.

The George Washington Henderson Fellowship Program was established at the University of Vermont in 2006 to honor his memory.
