= Joshua Collett =

American judge (1781–1855)

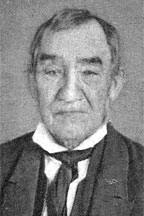

Ohio Supreme Court Associate Justice
- In office February 10, 1829 – February 4, 1836
- Preceded by: Jacob Burnet
- Succeeded by: Frederick Grimke

Personal details
- Born: November 20, 1781 Berkeley County, Virginia
- Died: May 23, 1855 (aged 73) Lebanon, Ohio
- Resting place: Pioneer Cemetery, Lebanon
- Spouse: Eliza Van Horne

Joshua Collett (November 20, 1781 – May 23, 1855) was a lawyer in the U.S. State of Ohio who was a judge on the Ohio Supreme Court 1829–1836.

== Biography ==
Joshua Collett was a native of Berkeley County, Virginia (now West Virginia), born November 20, 1781, read law in Martinsburg, and moved to Cincinnati just before Ohio was admitted to the union. Six months later, June 1803, he moved to Lebanon, Ohio, and was the first lawyer in Warren County.

Collett was elected Prosecuting Attorney of Warren County in 1810, and served ten years. He was then appointed judge of the Court of Common Pleas, and then re-appointed after seven years. He was appointed in 1829 to the Ohio Supreme Court, and retired from public office in 1836.

After the passage of Ohio's Fugitive Slave Act in 1840, Collett announced that in defiance of the law he would keep giving fugitive slaves supplies and directions.

Collett was a Presidential elector for the Whig Party in 1836 and 1840. Collett was a trustee of Miami University from 1824 to 1841.

One author characterized Collett thus: "He was modest, even to diffidence. ...his learning in the law and studious habits largely compensated for the lack of assurance. ... Throughout life he preserved a character for integrity, virtue, and benevolence."

Collett died on his farm near Lebanon May 23, 1855.

Collett married Eliza Van Horne on October 18, 1808 in Warren County. They were both Baptist Church members. Eliza died in 1846 and Joshua in 1855. Both were buried in Pioneer Cemetery in Lebanon.

== See also ==
- List of justices of the Ohio Supreme Court
