= Justice Grimke =

Justice Grimke may refer to:

- Frederick Grimke (1791–1863), associate justice of the Ohio Supreme Court
- John Faucheraud Grimké (1752–1819), associate justice of the South Carolina Court of Common Pleas and General Sessions
