= Susan Petigru King =

19th-century American realist, writer and novelist

Susan Dupont Petigru King-Bowen (October 23, 1824 – December 11, 1875) was a 19th-century American socialite, realist, fiction writer and novelist. Her work, which included Busy Moments of an Idle Woman (1853), Lily: A Novel (1855), Sylvia’s World: Crimes Which the Law Does Not Reach (1859), and Gerald Gray’s Wife (1864), focused on subversive portrayals of South Carolina aristocracy, in which men toyed with women’s affections, women plotted against one another’s best interests, and mothers forced daughters to choose wealth over romance.

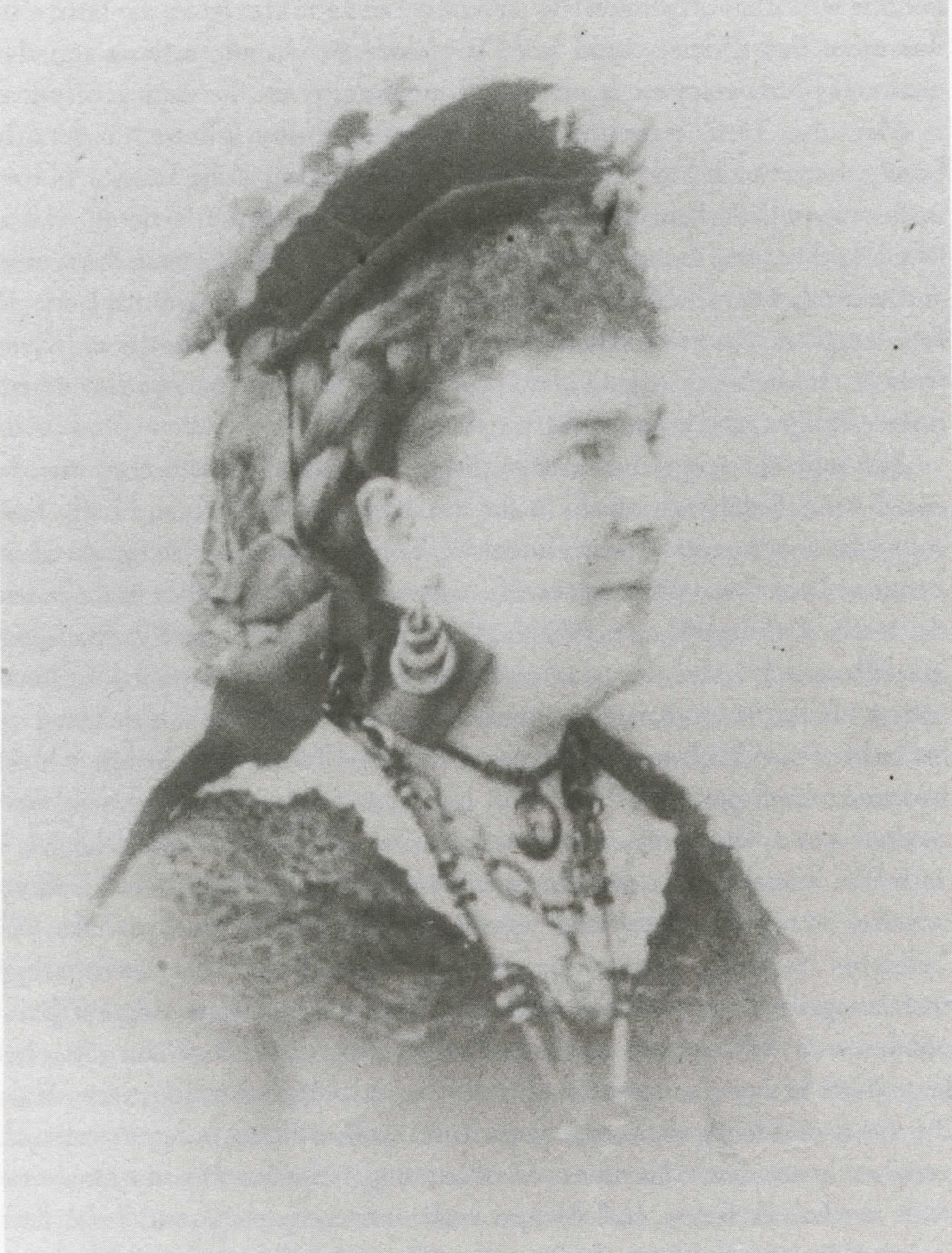
Susan Petigru King (1824–1875) Caroline Carson Photograph Album

== Biography ==
=== Childhood ===
Susan Dupont Petigru, known as "Sue", was born on October 23, 1824, as the youngest of four children. She was raised in her family’s home on Broad Street, within the center of Charleston’s elite business and social district. Her father, James Petigru, was an attorney and politician, while her mother, Jane Amelia Petigru, was the daughter of a rich Charleston planter. Her father was gone at least four months of the year on business, and the rest of the time thoroughly preoccupied with work.

Her mother suffered an emotional breakdown when Sue was only two years old. Her oldest brother, eight-year-old Albert, died from a fall off their third-floor bannister. This event, coupled with caring for three young children and three of James’s adolescent sisters, left Jane Amelia a physical and emotional wreck. She began to develop a series of illnesses, some real and some feigned, which increased her social isolation and encouraged a lifelong addiction to morphine. James’s sister Harriette wrote that Jane Amelia was an “unnatural” woman who "lies in bed from morning till night with every luxury about her & complains of poverty", and furthermore “makes her husband's time at home wretched.” Another sister-in-law, Louise Porcher, stated Jane Amelia possessed “heartless selfishness” and an obsession with “flattery & adulation,” all traits that would later be ascribed to her daughters.

Sue attended school first at Madame Talvande’s French School for Young Ladies in Charleston, along with classmate Mary Boykin Chesnut, and later at Madame Binsse’s in Philadelphia. At Talvande’s in particular she focused on French, the required language for both instructional and social dialogues, but she also studied chemistry, botany, astronomy, literature, rhetoric, German, art, dancing and music. The young women also attended social gatherings amongst their Madame’s acquaintances, during which they were expected to learn and practice their grace and etiquette. Sue, expecting the urban North to contain a world of excitement and adventure, was frequently discouraged by the social restrictions created by her father’s unwillingness to produce appropriate financing. She frequently wrote back complaining of malaise and depression, which her father claimed was feigned. Years later, Sue wrote that “it is so long since I have left this part of the country nine years; and when I was at the North, I was too young to appreciate or know its advantages.”

While he did not encourage her reckless spending, Sue’s father did encourage her love of reading and writing. He did, however, worry about her marriage prospects, having recognized that Sue bore both his own wit and temperament, without any ability or desire to control it.

=== Marriage to H.C. King ===
==== Courtship ====
The Panic of 1837 was a detrimental blow to James Petigru’s financial affairs. He had invested heavily in Mississippi’s speculated land market, and the new requirement of gold specie backing forced him to sell, among other items, his land holdings, his rice plantation, and most of his 137 slaves. Payments to creditors took almost the entirety of his wealth, and left him with only his home and his law office. Because of these dramatic losses Sue’s mother, Jane Amelia, pushed both daughters to marry for wealth. Eldest Caroline was the first daughter to cede, marrying William Carson, a man twice her age, in 1841. Sue followed two years later, marrying Henry Campbell King in 1843. The courtship between Henry and Sue was not an entirely romantic one. While not quite a catch, Henry King was considered the best Sue could hope for, considering her developing reputation as both saucy and outspoken. In terms of physical appearance, Sue was also less attractive than her fair-haired older sister.

Sue at first rejected Henry’s marriage proposal, much to the admonishment of her mother and sister. Her aunt Louise Porcher, on the other hand, considered it “safer & wise to refuse than accept,” for she could not “bear that so young a girl should be urged on that subject, as it is a step one cannot retrieve when once taken, & all the trials it may entail must be borne alone & in silence, as it is one of the few trial[s] that the sympathy of friends cannot alleviate but rather enhances.” Sue thought Henry “very short very broad & very round shouldered, & withal a little lame,” and Aunt Louise echoed that his looks presented a potential wife “substantial objection.” Aged 19, Sue did accept his second request, and a month later they married.

The marriage worked out well for Sue’s father, as James Petigru partnered in law practice with Henry and his own successful father, fellow attorney Judge Mitchell King. While Henry was almost as disinterested in his professional career as Sue King was in her domestic career, James eventually put Henry in charge of their practice's many law students, a position in which he thrived.

==== Early marriage years ====
The newlyweds spent their first two-and-a-half years of marriage living with Henry’s parents, during which their only child, Adele Allston King, was born. They didn’t leave the Kings’ home until Henry’s step-mother arranged for him to purchase an inherited house on Tradd Street through the funding of Henry’s father. Henry wrote frequently to his parents and extended family, often lamenting the lack of letters he received in turn. Despite the success of James, Mitchell and Henry’s law firm, Henry had few clients of his own, and his financial mismanagement, coupled with Sue’s lavish spending, forced him to borrow heavily from family members.

Their first years of marriage were amiable enough, with both partners humoring the other’s peculiar faults. When Sue looked back fondly on her unmarried life, a time when “the hours did dance away right joyously", Henry responded that she was "'a great goose for talking so' with a side glance at little [Adele] to point his remark."

Six years into their marriage, what little warmth existed between Henry and Sue had declined precipitously, and she began a series of long, extended visits to the North with her sister Caroline. These trips were done under the auspices of Caroline's ailing health, but for both women the more pressing reason was an escape from their troubled marriages. Caroline’s husband William had become an abusive alcoholic, and Sue tired of her husband’s malaise at home, as well as his drinking and gambling while away. Sue had also become cynical of “the stupid, self-sufficient, wearisome styles of young ladies” in Charleston. She criticized Southern women “who have not three ideas, who spoil a little French, who play a little music, and have not a grain of agreeability,” and proclaimed that “it was a wise dispensation of Providence which places no loftier aspirations within them.”

=== Literary career ===
In 1853, the publication of Sue's first book, Busy Moments of an Idle Woman, provided her with favorable critical notices and yet another reason for Sue and Caroline to leave home and tour the Northeast. One critic, while concerned over Charleston society's potentially negative reaction, called her first work "decidedly a clever book ... The Authoress is a true woman – her eye never fails to take in at a glance the whole dress of every lady she meets, and she reports it with, perhaps, rather too much detail." In Washington, Sue wrote that they “seem to have been followed by 'the men', perfectly monopolized and idolized– even clergy-men followed in their train – they repeated that no women before had ever had such a successful career in Washington.” Sue's father James was equally impressed with his daughter:

You have burst upon me as an author…So little was I anticipating such a thing…I have no doubt that you will receive a great deal of praise, for the dialogue is witty and sparkling, and the descriptions circumstantial and striking. I dare say that if you were to take to study, you might, in time, attain to the delineation of the passions and rise to the walk in which Miss Austen is admired… [Busy Moments] will be remembered longer than anything that any of the rest of us have done.

In 1855, Sue followed up Busy Moments with Lily: A Novel, and in 1959 a novel and short story collection under the shared title Sylvia’s World: Crimes Which the Law Does Not Reach. Her family members responded favorably to the quality of her writing, but far less so to its clearly biographical content. One cousin called her stories “the mere embodifications of what she has seen,” while another found her characters "extremely mortifying" since "every body recognizes them." A third was discomfited that she was able "to recognize so many of the anecdotes" in Sue's satirical depictions of troubled marriages and courtships. King published her work anonymously, as encouraged by her father, who believed that "the interest would be better kept up by standing in the reserve and making the authorship a sort of secret … it can’t be more, considering how many are in the plot."

Sue’s literary success and subsequent travels were paired with the increasing deterioration of her marriage to Henry. In the summer of 1856, Mitchell King wrote in his journal that his son's "reference to Sue [was] very very unhappy", and that Henry had provided him “very briefly & unsatisfactorily … a very lame account of their relations.” Cousin Carey North saw blame on both sides, calling Sue a "nearly mad, unfortunate woman, but others are not blameless".

=== Henry's death ===
By 1861, Sue and Henry had unofficially separated which, by the nature of South Carolina’s marriage laws, was the farthest apart the two could hope to become. After joining the Confederate Army at the outbreak of the Civil War, Henry was shot in the stomach during the Battle of Secessionville, and died in the summer of 1862. Sue donned mourning, but cousin Carey North believed Sue had to “act considerably” in doing so.

The death of Henry was a blow to their daughter Adele, who had begun disassociating herself from her mother’s reckless behavior. “Aunts and cousins readily agreed that Sue had little sympathy for children and no talent as a mother,” according to Jane and William Pease. Sue was already mocking her daughter’s “affected & very absurd” behavior at age six, and the constant fighting between mother and father left the only child with little understanding of healthy social discourse.

In later life, Adele would make a complete break with her mother, and Sue would lament her inability to visit her daughter and grandchildren. The subsequent collection (mostly by Henry’s brothers and sisters) of her husband’s outstanding debts left Sue with little more than $1,000. The war prevented her from finding suitable publishing for her next novel, Gerald Gray’s Wife, and its eventual release by Southern Field and Fireside provided no subsequent royalties. Public readings in the North were meagerly attended, and so she moved to Columbia, South Carolina to work as a clerk in the Confederate treasury office. In 1863, after the death of her father, Sue lived for almost a year with her widowed mother, although their relations were severely strained. Jane Amelia’s addiction had progressed to the point where she was begging Confederate officer George Alfred Trenholm to procure and smuggle morphine across enemy lines. At this point Sue was particularly depressed about her social affairs, writing that:

I am obliged to shut my eyes and ears to the most glaring things, or else live in total solitude – for between the supercilious neglect of one half and the covert slander of t’other, my couch of life has many crumpled rose leaves – and I really have to be grateful to those who only abuse me behind my back, and are not impertinent to my helpless face. And then for my as-yet-unexploded-in-any-way acquaintances – not only is their number very small, but like the sieges, it is a mere matter of time.

Sue left her mother in December 1863 to return to Columbia, where according to one cousin, she was determined "to make herself notorious during the sitting of the Legislature", a prospect at which she wholly succeeded. Sue dressed in lavish outfits of bright coloring, equipped with the finest accoutrements her meager estate could provide. Her flirty behavior attracted the attention of a number of young soldiers and married officers from the Confederate army. Later in 1865, Sue was seen cavorting with victorious Yankees in Charleston, to which one gentleman responded "There goes Mrs K driven by a Yankee thief in my uncle's Stolen Buggy." Yet it was not until 1870, while working as a foreign-language clerk in Washington’s Post Office Department, that Sue participated in her most scandalous and damning public affair – her marriage to Radical Republican and carpetbagger Christopher Columbus Bowen.

=== Marriage to C.C. Bowen ===
Eight years her junior, Bowen was perhaps the only figure in Sue's life whose notoriety exceeded that of her own. Born in Rhode Island, Bowen had worked a series of odd jobs until eventually making his way to Georgia, where he volunteered (after being threatened with conscription) in the Confederate cavalry. After forging a commanding officer’s signature on a furlough pass to gamble in Charleston and Savannah, Bowen was court-martialed and dishonorably discharged. He then hired a fellow soldier to murder said officer, for which he was arrested and imprisoned in Charleston. While Bowen was awaiting trial, the city of Charleston was successfully invaded by Union forces and Bowen, among other prisoners, was released. He then began working for the Freedmen’s Bureau, which he was fired from shortly thereafter for "irregularities in his accounts."

Afterward, he began acting as a pro-bono lawyer for newly freed slaves, and the connections he developed allowed him to become first a Republican delegate to South Carolina’s 1868 constitutional convention, and later the elected representative of its first congressional district.

In 1871, after marrying Sue, Bowen was arrested and tried on charges of bigamy brought by two former wives, one of which owned several brothels and was later convicted as a serial killer. Sue deftly and adamantly defended her husband both in court and in public, writing to one Washington newspaper that she knew “that he had been an orphan boy, without relations or friends; had drifted into the company of gamblers and prostitutes, and had lived their life until it had pleased the good god to lift him from the mire.”

Bowen received a two-year prison sentence and a $250 fine, but Sue appealed to President Ulysses S. Grant, who eventually offered Bowen a full pardon. Bowen was reelected in 1872, but an investigation by the House of Representatives deemed both his and his opponent's campaigns too corrupt to be officially recognized. Yet Bowen had also been elected as sheriff of Charleston County, a position he would hold through Sue's death in 1875.

=== Last years ===
Sue’s last years were spent in social isolation, shunned from both Charleston’s aristocracy and her extended family. Her marriage to Bowen, a man considered a thief, murderer, bigamist and traitor, was too much for even her few remaining supporters – aunt Adèle and sister Caroline – to bear. All ties were severed. Her daughter became her “worst enemy” and “bitterest foe.” Sue wrote that "of what constitutes ‘society,’ I have none. My parties are all given by myself: my guests are, for the most part, old & poor & forlorn – less friendless perhaps than I, but a great deal more destitute than I ever was.” Yet, unlike the rest of her family, Sue's postwar years were spent in relative luxury, her husband having procured a fine mansion in a tony Charleston neighborhood, less than a mile from Sue’s childhood home on Broad Street. When she died of typhoid pneumonia in December, her legal will mysteriously disappeared, along with her remaining jewelry. Within a year, Bowen was remarried to the eighteen-year-old daughter of South Carolina’s Radical Republican governor, Daniel Henry Chamberlain.

== Scandals ==
In 1854, following the success of Busy Moments of an Idle Woman, James Petigru toasted his daughter Sue as “quick in conception and easy in delivery.” According to family gossip, Sue raised her glass and toasted her father as “a man of large parts and deep penetration."

In 1855, Sue attended a party at her father’s Charleston home for a celebrated British writer William Makepeace Thackeray. Their first introduction, one year prior, had been a tense one: Thackeray told Sue he had heard that she was "a fast woman." Sue quipped back “And I have been told that you were a gentleman” Lucy Baxter described the night's dinner discussion:

Where I went alone with [Thackeray], my sister not being well, a lady was present who from their first meeting had antagonized Mr. Thackeray. She was clever and rather brilliant, but had written some very trashy novels, whose reputation had certainly not extended beyond her native city. On this and other occasions she seemed determined to attract Mr. Thackeray’s attention, to his great annoyance. At last when something was said about the tribulations of authors, the lady leaned across the table, saying in a lour voice, ‘You and I, Mr. Thackeray, being in the same boat, can understand, can we not?’ A dead silence fell, a thundercloud descended upon the face of Mr. Thackeray, and the pleasure of the entertainment was at an end…. This annoyance on the part of the lady was the culmination of numerous attacks, and struck just the wrong chord. She is referred to as the ‘Individual’ in a letter to my mother.

Thackeray himself described Sue in more mixed terms: "I got on by feeling and expressing a fellow-loathing for a certain person whose name I daresay you can guess. And yet vulgar as that Individual is I rather like h- bless me I was going to mention the Individual's sex!”

Also in 1855, J. W. Stuart sent a letter about Sue to his mother:

Mary Rhett has been spending a few days here. She is a very charming interesting girl, but without distraction. She seems fascinated with the company of Mrs. King. God protect her and her brothers from Mrs. King! Her brothers are chiefly to blame. If they go on much longer with Mrs. King, they will compromise the position in society of all three sisters. I think you should forbid Claudia’s having anything to do with Mrs.King. She and father never mention Mrs. King’s name. Mrs. King, I believe, is a bad woman.

In 1856, Sue attended a costume ball as the "Marquise of Louis 14th time", with powdered hair, piled and decorated with "a little pink silk hat with pink streamers", and a dress “open and drawn attached with beautiful opals or pearls set with diamonds.” Most shocking was her jewelry, borrowed from actress Sara Felix, sister to the madam of a notoriously opulent Charleston brothel. Sue wrote an anonymous account of the event, "Bal Costume", in the Charleston Courier. Considered a private affair, Sue was publicly scorned for her betrayal of the night's events. She later claimed that “Bal Costume” was a private letter, published without her consent, but was not believed.

In 1861, when William Hurlburt, journalist, abolitionist, and Carolina native, traveled from New York to Charleston, the Charleston Mercury announced his arrival and declared Hurlburt a traitor to Southern causes. Hurlburt disappeared from public view, and it was widely supposed that Sue, his long-time friend, had hidden him away in her home. Sue published an anonymous letter to a newspaper proclaiming Hurlburt’s innocence, which only fueled further speculation. Her aunts Louise and Adèle, along with her father-in-law Mitchell, considered Sue’s behavior akin to treason, and cut off all communications. Hurlburt was later discovered in Georgia, where he was arrested and jailed without trial.

A letter by James M. Morgan, written sometime during the American Civil War, implicates Sue and himself in hiding gold for Confederate officer George Alfred Trenholm (the same blockade runner Sue’s mother was pleading with to acquire morphine). James wrote:

[Sue] led the way upstairs to her bedroom, and directing me to help her we pulled off the coverings of a bed that was dainty enough to be the resting-place of a fairy. We then rolled back the upper mattress and I began to unload the yellow double eagles. The breast and tail pockets of my coat were filled with the handsome coins…and while I was thus engaged the beautiful lady, standing on the opposite side of the bed, was engaged in spreading them over the lower mattress. We then replaced the upper mattress, and I could not help but laugh when I realized the extraordinary situation in which I found myself, assisting a strange lady in the making-up of her bed! Mrs. King was laughing, too, but for a different reason. Her cause of merriment was so good that she could not keep it to herself. Everybody knew that Mr. Wagner had paid ten thousand dollars to keep from being arrested…and Mrs. King’s joke was that the provost marshal, who had scared Mr. Wagner out of the money, and the commanding general, were both present among her guests downstairs.

In 1864, Sue was attending a Columbia gathering at the home of friendand former classmate Mary Boykin Chesnut. One guest described Sue as “gorgeously” dressed in "the unenclothesed common", and that she "went for Captain James, straight as an arrow." Later, Chesnut described a scene in which she asked Sue to put on a shawl. "Why?" asked Sue. "'Such shoulders &c &c – bare &c &c – make you look that willing – too willing, you know.' 'Willing for what?' 'Another husband.'"

Over fifty years after Sue’s death, her reputation was mentioned in the letters of one Yates Snowden. Yates wrote: “Noticeing [sic] considerable face powder on J. J. E's shoulder one evening, a friend asked; ‘John, where did you get all that powder’? ‘Oh,’ said he, with a laugh; ‘I have just returned from a visit to Sue Petigru’! From which I would infer that ‘necking parties’ in Charleston were not unknown in the good old days – ‘when Plaucus was consul.’”

== Religious beliefs ==
Sue bore no marks of the religious devotion that other Petigru women, including sister Caroline, ascribed to. Before the Civil War, Sue had “spoofed high-church ritual and cut short a brief flirtation with Methodism.” Immediately after the outbreak of war, Sue was confirmed in the Episcopal church, although this too was brief in tenure. Finally, shortly before her death at age 51 from typhoid pneumonia, Sue flirted with Roman Catholicism (as she was being cared for by Catholic nuns), but died before any actual religious conversion occurred.

== Political views ==
For most of her life, Sue was characteristically dismissive of heated political debates although, like the rest of the slave-holding Petigru family, she was adamantly against any form of abolition. In 1850, amid constant talk of South Carolina’s possible secession, Sue wrote to her aunt Adèle of her decision to "laugh at the whole business – have not the slightest respect for the whole body of legislators." Sue fantasized that if she were "Governor for a day or two … with what delight I would have responded to the [students] letters requesting ‘arms & ammunitions!’ There would have been such an order for pop-guns & pluffers and poison berries & peas issued from ‘Head Quarters.’" After the assault on Fort Sumter in 1861, however, Sue briefly became "a violent patriot", and compared the Confederate siege to “Joshua before the Walls of Jericho."

When the Civil War ended, she used her father’s outstanding reputation among Unionists to curry favor within Washington's social circles. She also helped to publish a political journal in support of her second husband’s campaign efforts, and their Charleston home was frequently visited by both white Republicans and black Freedmen.

== Modern critical reception ==
From J.R. Scafidel's Susan Petigru King: An Early South Carolina Realist:

The tradition of realistic or anti-romantic fiction in the ante-bellum South has in recent years [ca. 1975] begun to assert itself in literary scholarship, mainly as a result of interest in this kind of fiction in the twentieth century. Modern scholars have established and are now examining the strain of strong masculine fiction represented by such writers as A.B. Longstreet, William Tappan Thompson, Johnson Jones Hooper, and George Washington Harris. Yet the kind of fiction written by Susan Petigru King, psychological realism in comedies of manners, has been totally ignored, and, I suppose, assumed to be non-existent in this period. King as a psychological realist very clearly belongs to the group of writers that includes William Dean Howells and Henry James, yet today she enjoys no recognition as such in literature. In this particular tradition of realism, one that complements that of the humorists of the Old South, Susan Petigru King does have a place. As a result of that place, her work stands as a significant contribution to the fiction of South Carolina.

Steven M. Stowe’s City, Country, and the Feminine Voice compares three female, Antebellum, South Carolina writers – Sue King, Mary Boykin Chesnut and Caroline Howard Gilman – to see how their writing interprets and draws distinctions between the city and the country, specifically in how these places shape women’s lives. Stowe’s essay describes:

What Sue King perceived from the interiors of drawing rooms and what Mary Chesnut understood from wartime upheaval: instead of being parts of a single intellectual and social domain, city and country had grown more distinct and distant; always representative of different sensibilities, they represented by the 1850s a theme of disturbing polarity. For women, it became a strong motif in their description of their sphere and its new, problematic artificiality and constriction. The feminine voice of Caroline Gilman that so surely touched women’s feelings and aspirations in the 1830s had become less audible, less convincing in its story of the smooth road Home. The older subjective truths locked away from the city’s rush began to seem not simply deluded but fundamentally unreal.

Sandra Barrett Moore’s 2002 Ph.D. dissertation Women in an ‘Age of Humbug’: Authority, Sentiment, and Pursuit of the Real in the Work of Louisa McCord and Sue King, begins with two separate definitions of Antebellum South Carolina’s humbug as described by two very different Charleston women writers: Sue King and the "arch-conservative essayist" Louisa McCord. Whereas Sue King saw humbug in "a time of overblown artifice and argument over basic matters of social and cultural authority", as well as “the sentimental constructs and hypocrisies that constrained individual expression and representation, especially of women, in her genteel society,” McCord took a different tack. She disagreed with “unconstrained expression and emotion – ‘the humbug cant’ and ‘sentimental whim’ – that galvanized initiatives of representation and reform” within abolitionist or Unionist arguments. One woman was a scandalous fiction writer, and the other a highly conservative essayist, yet Moore writes that “both women expressed dismay about the general exaggeration that defined the fashions in antebellum life and letters."

Nancy R. Mace's 2003 M.A. thesis, Susan Petigru King and the Culture of Antebellum Women in High Life, considers the breadth of King's accomplishments, choosing in particular to focus on her less-critically examined short stories. Mace analyzes Sue King collective work for the ways in which it subverts the major themes of the Cult of True Womanhood, specifically piety, purity, submissiveness and domesticity. Mace concludes:

Not all women portrayed in nineteenth century periodicals embraced [Barbara] Welter’s concept of True Womanhood. In fact, King’s work showed women in the mid-nineteenth century as often defying those characteristics. Piety was a trait in women who were cruel … Purity was only reserved for the young and naïve … Submissiveness was not a virtue, but rather a hindrance in life that very few female characters embraced … Domesticity was never a primary topic within King’s writing … When domestic affairs were mentioned it was apparent that women in King’s stories were not fond of matronly or domestic roles … Consequently, King’s fiction does not coincide with the fiction that other scholars have found was printed in The Lady’s Book or Graham’s.

== Complete list of works ==
- Busy Moments of an Idle Woman. New York: Appleton, 1853. Included is the short story:
  1. Old Maidism Versus Marriage
- Lily: a Novel. New York: Harper’s, 1855.
- “Bal Costume.” Charleston Daily Courier, (10 March 1856).
- “Woman’s Warning: An Allegory.” Russell’s Magazine, 1 (April 1857): 64-66.
- “A Braid of Auburn Hair.” Russell’s Magazine, (June 1857): 219-223.
- “Lucy Sheldon’s Dream.” Russell’s Magazine, (August 1857): 461-464.
- “Crimes Which the Law Does Not Reach: Gossip.” Russell’s Magazine, (October 1857): 47-51.
- “Crimes Which the Law Does Not Reach: Marriage of Persuasion.” Russell’s Magazine, (November 1857): 111-115.
- “Crimes Which the Law Does Not Reach: Male Flirt.” Russell’s Magazine, (December 1857): 201-211.
- “Charles Kingsley’s ‘Two Years Ago.’” Russell’s Magazine, (1857): 169-174.
- “Crimes Which the Law Does Not Reach: The Best of Friends.” Russell’s Magazine, (January 1858): 355-365.
- “Crimes Which the Law Does Not Reach: A Coquette.” Russell’s Magazine, (March 1858): 545-555.
- “How Gertrude was Married.” Russell’s Magazine, (June 1858): 244-252.
- “A Little Lesson for Little Ladies: Cora’s Dream.” Russell’s Magazine, (August, 1858): 448-451.
- “A Little Lesson for Little Ladies: The Story Her Uncle Told Lucy.” Russell’s Magazine, (October 1858): 73-77.
- “Correspondence.” Russell’s Magazine, (July 1859).
- Sylvia’s World: Crimes Which the Law Does Not Reach. New York: Derby and Jackson, 1859.
- “My Ball Tablets.” Russell’s Magazine, (January 1860): 355-363.
- Gerald Gray’s Wife. First serialized in Southern Field and Fireside, (January 1864).
- “My Debut.” Harper’s Magazine, (1867): 531-546.
