= American Negro Academy =

The American Negro Academy (ANA), founded in Washington, D.C., in 1897, was the first organization in the United States to support African-American academic scholarship. It operated until 1928, and encouraged African Americans to undertake classical academic studies and liberal arts.

== History ==
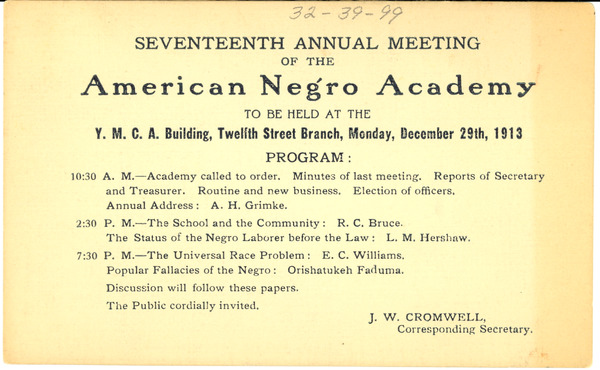
Program for the 17th Annual Meeting of the American Negro Academy

It was intended to provide support to African Americans working in classic scholarship and the arts, as promoted by W. E. B. Du Bois in his essays about the Talented Tenth, and others of the elite. This was in contrast to Booker T. Washington's approach to education at Tuskegee University in Alabama, which he led. There he emphasized vocational and industrial training for southern blacks, which he thought were more practical for the lives that most blacks would live in the rural, segregated South.

== Members ==
=== Founding members ===
The founders of the ANA were primarily authors, scholars, and artists. They included Alexander Crummell, an Episcopal priest and Republican from New York City, who had also worked in Liberia for two decades and founded the first independent black Episcopal church in Washington, D.C.; John Wesley Cromwell of Washington, D.C.; Paul Laurence Dunbar, poet and writer in Washington; Walter B. Hayson; Archibald Grimké (brother of Francis), attorney and writer; and scientist Kelly Miller. Crummell served as founding president.

Their first meeting on March 5, 1897, included eighteen members:

- Blanche K. Bruce
- Levi J. Coppin
- William H. Crogman
- John Wesley Cromwell
- Alexander Crummell, an Episcopal clergyman, trained in theology and a prominent church founder.
- W. E. B. Du Bois, scholar and activist, a co-founder in 1909 of the National Association for the Advancement of Colored People (NAACP).
- Paul Laurence Dunbar
- William H. Ferris
- Francis J. Grimké, PhD, a Presbyterian clergyman, trained in theological studies. Brother of Archibald.
- Benjamin F. Lee
- Kelly Miller, PhD, professor of mathematics, known as the first black graduate student to enroll at Johns Hopkins University.
- William S. Scarborough
- John H. Smythe
- Theophilus G. Steward
- T. McCants Stewart
- Benjamin Tucker Tanner
- Robert Heberton Terrell
- Richard R. Wright

=== Other prominent members ===
- Orishatukeh Faduma, missionary and educator
- George Washington Henderson, theologian and academic
- John Hope, president of Morehouse College and Atlanta University
- James Weldon Johnson, writer and civil rights advocate for the NAACP
- Alain Locke, philosopher
- Robert Pelham Jr., journalist, civil servant, and civil rights activist
- Arturo Alfonso Schomburg, historian, writer, activist, and founder of the Schomburg Center for Research in Black Culture
- Carter G. Woodson, historian, editor
- Monroe Work, sociologist, activist, and editor
- Robert Tecumtha Browne (1882–1978), was a prominent member. In 1914 he co-founded the Negro Library Association in New York City. In 1919 he published his masterwork, The Mystery of Space, considered a synthesis of "mathematics, hyperspace, Eastern religious philosophy, theosophy, and mysticism," which was highly praised by mainstream press. He had concealed his race to get the book published. Browne served as the vice president of ANA in 1921, the same year in which he delivered the keynote address, entitled "Einstein's Theory of Relativity". He revised the group's bylaws, at the invitation of Arturo Schomburg.

=== Early meetings ===
The academy was organized in 1897 in Washington, D.C. Black newspapers expressed excitement that the academy would have possibilities to serve a large audience, seeking to elevate the race through educational enlightenment. Through an assessment of statistical trends, mainly concerning black illiteracy, the academy planned its work to be published in its Occasional Papers. The scholarly contributions aided the spirit of blacks in the South, who were being disenfranchised by white-dominated legislatures, who also imposed Jim Crow laws.

The academy generally held an annual meeting of one to two days at Lincoln Temple United Church of Christ in Washington, D.C. The public was invited to attend all but the academy's business meetings, reserved solely for members. The schedule would occupy the entire day. Reports were presented by the academy's secretary and treasurer. During this time, new membership applications to the academy were considered, as well as discussions on current business. In the evening, an annual address was delivered. For example, W. E. B. Du Bois presented the academy's second annual address. A presentation of a paper would follow. The following day, after several paper presentations, discussions took place. Discussions centered around the efficacy of a scholar's musings. Copies of papers were available upon requests made directly to the academy's secretary, or through newspaper requests.

== Legacy and efficacy ==
The ANA was part of the early struggle for equal rights for blacks, seeking to support their academic efforts. It was organized shortly after the United States Supreme Court had upheld the principle of "separate but equal" in the 1896 case Plessy v. Ferguson.

DuBois suggested that a Talented Tenth of African Americans, primarily composed of blacks trained in classical higher education, could lead in educating masses of black citizens. He knew that most of the latter, who still lived in the rural South, would likely work in rural or unskilled jobs. But he wanted to provide opportunities for blacks who could surpass those limits. Through a publication of works among the academy's Occasional Papers, the group wanted to expand the reach of its scholarship. As Crummel said, to aid the black intellectual's efforts to have influence on "his schools, academies and colleges; and then enters his pulpits; and so filters down into his families and his homes ... to be a laborer with intelligence, enlightenment and manly ambitions".

Scholars have disputed the influence of the academy. Alfred A. Moss Jr. argued for its efficacy in The American Negro Academy: Voice of the Talented Tenth. In his analysis of a collection of private letters written by Crummell, Moss said that nearly from the beginning, the academy was bound to decline. It was unable to consistently organize; it struggled to recruit new members, and especially to raise scholarship funds for the education of more students. Moss claims that founding member Archibald Henry Grimké expressed in his writings an understanding of the difficulties and socio-economic hardships among African Americans, but, given efforts to unseat him as ANA president, he spent more effort on self-serving interests.

== See also ==
- Talented Tenth
- Negro
- African-American upper class
