= Nathaniel C. Reed =

American judge

Nathaniel Clark Reed

Justice of the Ohio Supreme Court
- In office March 5, 1842 – March 5, 1849
- Preceded by: Frederick Grimke
- Succeeded by: Rufus Paine Spalding

Personal details
- Born: 1810 Champaign County, Ohio, U.S.
- Died: December 28, 1853 (aged 43) San Francisco, California, U.S.
- Resting place: City Cemetery
- Party: Democratic
- Education: Ohio University

Nathaniel Clark Reed or Read (circa 1810 – December 28, 1853) was a lawyer from the U.S. state of Ohio who sat on the Ohio Supreme Court for seven years.

== Biography ==
Nathaniel Reed, sometimes spelled Read, was born about 1810 in Champaign County, Ohio. He attended Ohio University in Athens, Ohio and studied law under Israel Hamilton of Urbana, Ohio. After he was admitted to the bar, he moved to Cincinnati, Ohio.

Reed was elected to a two-year term as prosecuting attorney of Hamilton County in 1835. He was elected by the legislature as presiding judge of the Court of Common Pleas ninth circuit in 1839. He also was on the Ohio University Board of Trustees from 1840 to 1845.

Reed was elected by the legislature to the Ohio Supreme Court in 1842 to a seven-year term to replace Frederick Grimke, resigned. In 1845 he wrote the opinion in State vs. Hopess, a fugitive slave case, where Reed upheld the Fugitive Slave Law of 1793. When Reed's term expired in 1849, abolitionists held a majority in the legislature, and they chose Rufus Paine Spalding to replace Reed.

Reed returned to Cincinnati, but soon moved to San Francisco, California, where he practiced law. He died there in 1853 and was buried at Yerba Buena Cemetery, which was relocated to City Cemetery.

== Reputation ==
Nineteenth-century authors assessed Reed as learned and wise, but they also alluded to personal vices which led to an early death:

He was a man of marked ability, and had a clear comprehension of the law. He several times dissented from the majority and his dissent was recognized as the true rule. His usefulness was marred by his personal habits...

— Manning Force, 1897

He frequently dissented from the majority and more good sound law may be found in his dissenting opinions than in the majority opinion.

— Edgar Kinkade, 1895

Judge Reed was a man of elegant literary attainments, scholarly, but an erratic genius, whose whole-souled generosity and liberality proved his ruin. After two or three years practice in San Francisco, California, he fell victim to that vice which has proved a destroyer of so many men. He died in 1853, at the early age of forty-three years.

— Medico-Legal Journal, 1900
