= James L. Petigru =

American politician

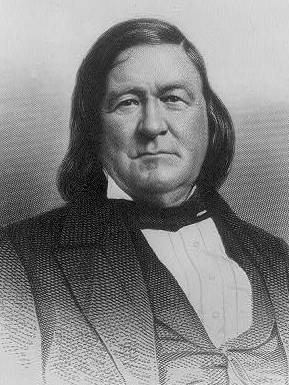

6th Attorney General of South Carolina
- In office 1822–1830
- Preceded by: Robert Young Hayne
- Succeeded by: Hugh S. Legaré

Member of the South Carolina House of Representatives
- In office 1830–1830

Personal details
- Born: James Louis Petigru; May 10, 1789 Abbeville, South Carolina, U.S.
- Died: March 9, 1863 (aged 73) Charleston, South Carolina, U.S.
- Party: Whig

James Louis Petigru (May 10, 1789 – March 9, 1863) was an American lawyer, politician, and jurist in South Carolina. He is best known for his service as the Attorney General of South Carolina and his judicial work that played a key role in the recodification of the state's law code. He was also known for opposing nullification and, in 1860, state secession.

== Career ==
Coat of Arms of James L. Petigru

Petigru graduated from South Carolina College in 1809, and was admitted to the South Carolina bar in 1812. In 1816, he was elected as the solicitor of Abbeville County, South Carolina. He became the Attorney General of South Carolina in 1822.

In 1830, after having lost a bid for a seat in the South Carolina Senate, he was elected to fill a vacant seat in the South Carolina House of Representatives. He was the leader of the anti-nullificationists in that body.

He also acted as lead attorney in the case of M'Cready v. Hunt, focusing on test oaths and states' rights, which was brought before the South Carolina Court of Appeals in 1834. The case involved a "test oath" passed by the South Carolina legislature in November 1832, requiring members of the state militia to pledge "faithful and true allegiance" to the State of South Carolina. The law was vague on the underlying and contentious issue of sovereignty, and did not specifically state whether allegiance to the state was superior to allegiance to the federal government. Given tensions of the times, dispute over interpretation of the oath immediately erupted. The "Nullifier" faction asserted that allegiance to the state had precedence over allegiance to the federal government, while "Unionists" asserted that the federal government had primacy over all states.

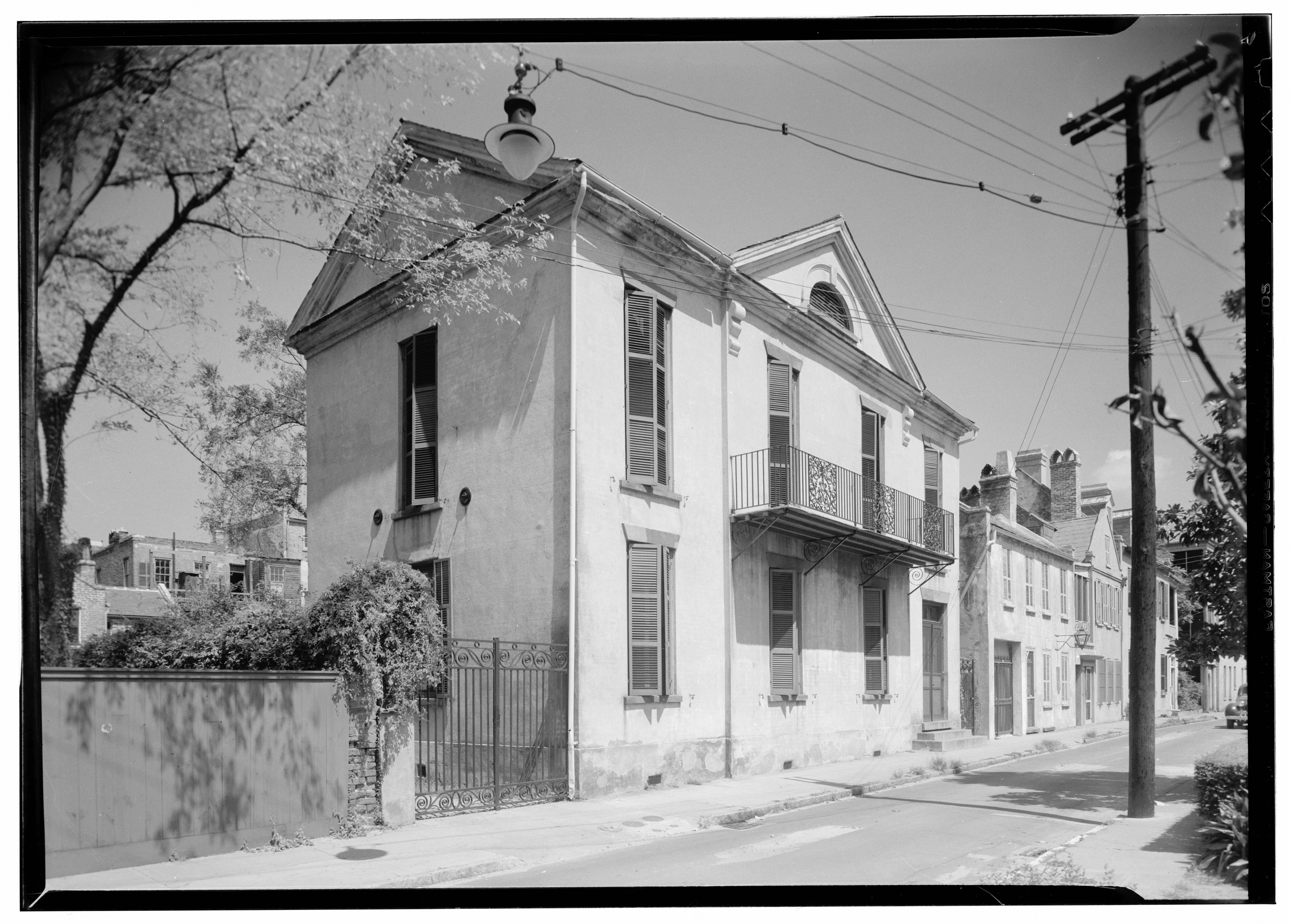
James Louis Petigru Law Office, 8 St. Michael's Place, Charleston.

Eventually, a legal case on the validity of the test oath reached the state Court of Appeals in Columbia. Attorney Robert Barnwell Rhett, of Beaufort argued for the test oath with the support of state Governor Robert Y. Hayne. In opposition, the Unionist Petigru was joined by business attorney Abram Blanding of Columbia, and Thomas Smith Grimké of Charleston. The June 2, 1834 decision from the three judges fell 2 to 1 for the Unionists. "Nullifiers" immediately called for the impeachment of the two jurists. "Nullifier" legislators responded to the decision by calling for a constitutional amendment to legalize the test oath and assert the primacy of allegiance to South Carolina.

Petigru joined the Whig Party and supported its economic programs. At the 1852 Whig National Convention, Petigru received the South Carolinian delegation's support for Vice President.

After South Carolina seceded in 1860, Petigru famously remarked, "South Carolina is too small for a republic and too large for an insane asylum." Petigru opposed the Confederacy, although he did not believe that South Carolina would return to the Union.

In 1859, he had been entrusted with the codification of the laws of South Carolina; he completed the task in December 1862. His code was rejected by the unreconstructed legislature of 1865, but formed the basis for the codification of 1872.

Petigru died in 1863 in Charleston, and is buried in St. Michael's Churchyard. He was the father of Susan Petigru King.

== See also ==
- Nullification Crisis of 1832
- South Carolina Court of Appeals
