= Angelina Weld Grimké =

American journalist and playwright (1880–1958)

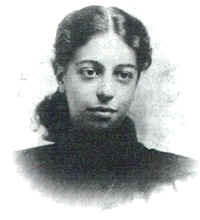
- Born: February 27, 1880; Boston, Massachusetts, USA
- Died: June 10, 1958 (aged 78); New York City, USA
- Education: Boston Normal School of Gymnastics, later Wellesley College
- Occupations: Author; journalist; poet

Angelina Weld Grimké (February 27, 1880 – June 10, 1958) was an African-American journalist, teacher, playwright, and poet.

By ancestry, Grimké was three-quarters white — the child of a white mother and a half-white father — and considered a woman of color. She was one of the first African-American women to have a play publicly performed.

== Life and career ==
Angelina Weld Grimké was born in Boston, Massachusetts, in 1880 to a biracial family. Her father, Archibald Grimké, was a lawyer and of mixed race, son of a white slave owner and a mixed-race enslaved woman of color his father owned; he was of the "negro race" according to the society he grew up in. He was the second African American to graduate from Harvard Law School. Her mother, Sarah Stanley, was European American, from a Midwestern middle-class family.

Grimké's parents met in Boston, where her father had established a law practice. Angelina was named after her father's paternal white aunt Angelina Grimké Weld, who, along with her sister Sarah Grimké, had brought him and his two brothers (Francis and John) into her family after learning about them after his father's death. (They were the sons of her late slave-owning brother Henry, also one of the wealthy white Grimké planter family.)

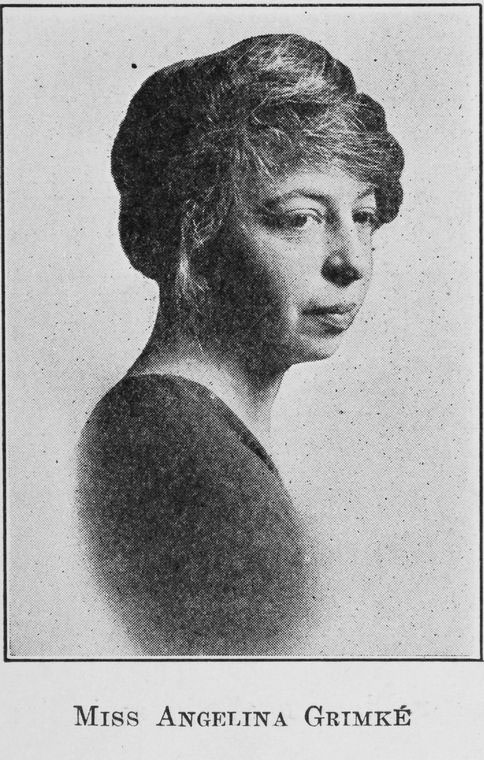
Angelina W. Grimké from a 1923 publication

When Grimké and Sarah Stanley married, they faced strong opposition from her family, due to concerns over race. The marriage did not last very long. Soon after their daughter Angelina's birth, Sarah left Archibald and returned with the infant to the Midwest. After Sarah began a career of her own, she sent Angelina, then seven, back to Massachusetts to live with her father. Angelina Grimké would have little to no contact with her mother after that. Sarah Stanley committed suicide several years later.

Angelina's paternal grandfather was Henry Grimké, of a large and wealthy slaveholding family based in Charleston, South Carolina. Her paternal grandmother was Nancy Weston, an enslaved woman whom Henry owned; she was also of mixed race. Henry became involved with her as a widower. They lived together and had three sons: Archibald, Francis, and John (born after his father's death in 1852). Henry taught Nancy and the boys to read and write but kept them enslaved.

Among Henry's family were two sisters who had opposed slavery and left the South before he began his relationship with Weston; Sarah and Angelina Grimké became notable abolitionists in the North. The Grimkés were also related to John Grimké Drayton of Magnolia Plantation near Charleston, South Carolina. South Carolina had laws making it difficult for an individual to manumit slaves, even his own slave children. (See Children of the plantation.) Instead of trying to gain the necessary legislative approval required for each manumission, wealthy fathers often sent their children north for schooling to give them opportunities, and in hopes they would stay to live in a free state.

Angelina's uncle, Francis J. Grimké, graduated from Lincoln University (Pennsylvania) and Princeton Theological Seminary. He became a Presbyterian minister in Washington, D.C. He married Charlotte Forten, from a prominent and abolitionist family of color in Philadelphia, Pennsylvania. She became known as an abolitionist and diarist.

From the ages of 14 to 18, Angelina lived with her aunt and uncle, Charlotte and Francis, in Washington, D.C., and attended school there before enrolling in the preparatory academy attached to Carleton College in Northfield, Minnesota from 1895 to 1897. During this period, her father was serving as U.S. consul (1894 and 1898) to the Dominican Republic. Indicating the significance of her father's consulship in her life, Angelina later recalled, "it was thought best not to take me down to [Santo Domingo] but so often and so vivid have I had the scene and life described that I seem to have been there too."

Angelina Grimké attended the Boston Normal School of Gymnastics, which later became the Department of Hygiene of Wellesley College. After graduating, she and her father moved to Washington, D.C., to be with his brother Francis and family.

In 1902, Grimké began teaching English at the Armstrong Manual Training School, a black school in the segregated system of the capital. In 1916 she moved to a teaching position at the Dunbar High School for black students, renowned for its academic excellence. One of her pupils was the future poet and playwright May Miller. During the summers, Grimké frequently took classes at Harvard University, where her father had attended law school.

On July 11, 1911, Grimké was a passenger in a train wreck at Bridgeport, Connecticut, which she survived with a back injury that never fully healed. After her father took ill in 1928, she tended to him until his death in 1930. Afterward, she left Washington, D.C., for New York City. She lived a quiet retirement as a semi-recluse in an apartment on the Upper West Side. She died in 1958.

== Literary career ==
Grimké wrote essays, short stories and poems which were published in The Crisis, the newspaper of the NAACP, edited by W. E. B. Du Bois, and Opportunity. They were also collected in anthologies of the Harlem Renaissance: The New Negro, Caroling Dusk, and Negro Poets and Their Poems. Her more well-known poems include "The Eyes of My Regret", "At April", "Trees", and "El Beso". While living in Washington, DC, she was included among the figures of the Harlem Renaissance, as her work was published in its journals and she became connected to figures in its circle. Some critics place her in the period before the Renaissance. During that time, she counted the poet Georgia Douglas Johnson as one of her friends.

Grimké wrote Rachel – originally titled Blessed Are the Barren, one of the first plays to protest lynching and racial violence. The three-act drama was written for the National Association for the Advancement of Colored People (NAACP), which called for new works to rally public opinion against D. W. Griffith's recently released film, The Birth of a Nation (1915), which glorified the Ku Klux Klan and portrayed a racist view of blacks and of their role in the American Civil War and Reconstruction era in the South. Produced in 1916 in Washington, D.C., and subsequently in New York City, Rachel was performed by an all-black cast. Reaction to the play was good. The NAACP said of the play: "This is the first attempt to use the stage for race propaganda in order to enlighten the American people relating to the lamentable condition of ten millions of Colored citizens in this free republic."

Rachel portrays the life of an African-American family in the Northern United States in the early 20th century, where hundreds of thousands of blacks had migrated from the rural Southern United States in the Great Migration. Centered on the family of the title character, each role expresses different responses to the racial discrimination against blacks at the time. Grimké also explores themes of motherhood and the innocence of children. Rachel develops as she changes her perceptions of what the role of a mother might be, based on her sense of the importance of a naivete towards the terrible truths of the world around her. A lynching is the fulcrum of the play.

The play was published in 1920, but received little attention after its initial productions. In the years since, however, it has been recognized as a precursor to the Harlem Renaissance. It is one of the first examples of this political and cultural movement to explore the historical roots of African Americans.

Grimké wrote a second anti-lynching play, Mara, parts of which have never been published. Much of her fiction and non-fiction focused on the theme of lynching, including the short story "Goldie." It was based on the 1918 lynching in Georgia of Mary Turner, a married black woman who was the mother of two children and pregnant with a third when she was attacked and killed after protesting the lynching death of her husband.

== Sexuality ==
At the age of 16, Grimké wrote to a friend, Mary Edith Karn:

I know you are too young now to become my wife, but I hope, darling, that in a few years you will come to me and be my love, my wife! How my brain whirls how my pulse leaps with joy and madness when I think of these two words, 'my wife'"

Two years earlier, in 1903, Grimké and her father had a falling out when she told him that she was in love. Archibald Grimké responded with an ultimatum demanding that she choose between her lover and himself. Grimké family biographer Mark Perry speculates that the person involved may have been female, and that Archibald may already have been aware of Angelina's sexual leaning.

Analysis of her work by modern literary critics has provided strong evidence that Grimké was a lesbian or bisexual. Some critics believe this is expressed in her published poetry in a subtle way. Scholars found more evidence after her death when studying her diaries and more explicit unpublished works. The Dictionary of Literary Biography: African-American Writers Before the Harlem Renaissance states: "In several poems and in her diaries Grimké expressed the frustration that her lesbianism created; thwarted longing is a theme in several poems." Some of her unpublished poems are more explicitly lesbian, implying that she lived a life of suppression, "both personal and creative."
