= Archibald Grimké =

American lawyer and diplomat (1849–1930)

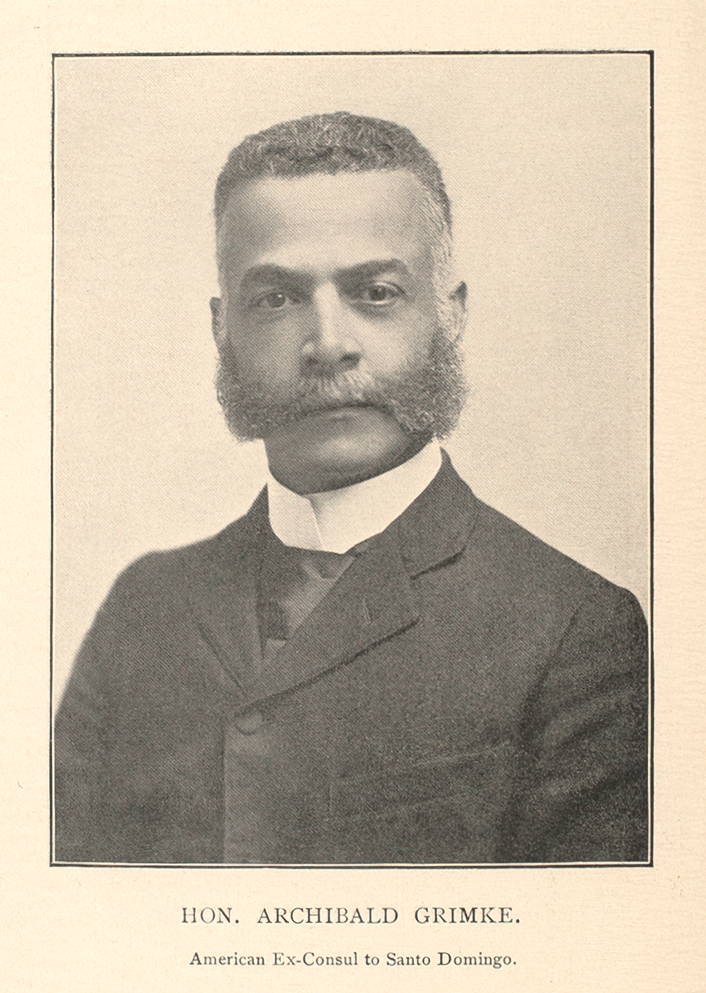
- Born: August 17, 1849; Charleston, South Carolina, U.S.
- Died: February 25, 1930 (aged 80); Washington, D.C., U.S.
- Occupations: attorney, diplomat, journalist
- Political party: Democratic (from 1884)
- Other political affiliations: Republican (until 1884)
- Spouse: Sarah Stanley
- Children: Angelina Weld Grimké
- Parents: Henry W. Grimké (father); Nancy Weston (enslaved mixed-race woman whose father was white) (mother)
- Relatives: Francis James Grimké, John (siblings); Angelina Grimké Weld, Sarah Moore Grimké, Thomas Smith Grimké (half-cousins)

Archibald Henry Grimké (August 17, 1849 – February 25, 1930) was an African-American lawyer, intellectual, journalist, diplomat and community leader in the 19th and early 20th centuries. He graduated from freedmen's schools, Lincoln University in Pennsylvania, and Harvard Law School, and served as American Consul to the Dominican Republic from 1894 to 1898. He was an activist for the rights of Black Americans, working in Boston and Washington, D.C. He was a national vice-president of the National Association for the Advancement of Colored People (NAACP), as well as president of its Washington, D.C. chapter.

== Early life and education ==
Grimké was born into slavery on his father's plantation near Charleston, South Carolina, in 1849. He was the eldest of three sons of Henry W. Grimké, a widower, and Nancy Weston, a very intelligent enslaved woman, crippled in one arm, who had been born into slavery as the daughter of an enslaved African woman; her father is unknown. Henry acknowledged his sons, although he neither freed them nor told the rest of his family of their existence. Archibald's brothers were Francis and John. Henry was a member of a prominent, sizeable family of enslavers in Charleston. His father and relatives were planters active in political and social circles.

After becoming a widower, Henry moved with Weston to a plantation, Cane Acre, 25 miles outside of Charleston. A modern scholar speculates that the move was motivated by Henry's desire to enjoy his relationship with Nancy free from the eyes of Charleston's white community. He was a father to his sons, teaching them and Nancy to read and write. In 1852, as he was dying, Henry willed Nancy, who was pregnant with their third child, and their two sons Archibald and Francis to his legal (white) son and heir Montague Grimké, whose mother was Henry's deceased wife. Henry was prohibited from freeing them by a South Carolina law passed in 1841 that did not allow for the release of enslaved people through gifts or trusts. He directed that they "be treated as members of the family," but Montague never provided well for them.

Henry's sister Eliza, executrix of his will, brought the family to Charleston, but she did not aid them financially. Montague allowed Nancy and her children to live relatively freely for a time, with Nancy working as a laundress to sustain the family. In 1860, Montague claimed the boys as house servants after marrying. Later, he hired out both Archibald and Francis due to their insubordination. After Francis rebelled, Montague Grimké sold him. Archibald ran away and hid for two years with relatives until after the end of the Civil War.

After the American Civil War ended, the three Grimké boys attended a freedmen's school, which Gilbert Pillsbury, the brother of abolitionist Parker Pillsbury, and his wife had opened. The Pillsburys recognized Archibald's and Francis' talents and raised support to send them to the North. They studied at Lincoln University in Pennsylvania, established for the education of African Americans. Their professors had found them extraordinary students, and both Archibald and Francis graduated from Lincoln in 1870. A Lincoln catalog of 1871 lists Archibald as "Instructor of English grammar".

Grimké graduated from Harvard Law School in 1874, becoming one of its first two Black graduates.

== Career ==
Archibald Grimké lived and worked in the Hyde Park neighborhood of the Boston area for most of his career. Beginning in the 1880s, he began to get active in politics and speaking out about the rise of white supremacy following the end of Reconstruction in the South. From 1883 to 1885, he was editor of the Hub, a Republican newspaper for African-American readers. Archibald supported equal rights for blacks in the papers and public lectures, which were popular in the nineteenth century. He became increasingly active in politics and was chosen for the Republican Party's state convention in 1884. That year he was also appointed to the board of Westborough Insane Hospital, a state hospital. Archibald became involved in the women's rights movement, which his aunts had supported, and addressed it in the Hub. He was elected president of the Massachusetts Woman Suffrage Association. Believing that the Republicans were not doing enough, he left the party in 1886. In 1889, he joined the staff of the Boston Herald as a special writer.

In the South, the situation for Blacks was deteriorating, and Archibald continued the struggle against racism, allying at times with other prominent leaders of the day. He had also become involved in Frederick Douglass' National Council of Colored People, a predecessor to the NAACP, which grappled with issues of education for blacks, especially in the South. Archibald disagreed with Booker T. Washington about emphasizing industrial and agricultural education for freedmen (the South still had a primarily agricultural economy). He believed there needed to be academic and higher education opportunities like he had.

In 1901, with several other men, he started The Guardian, a newspaper where they could express their views. They selected William Monroe Trotter as editor. Grimké and Trotter organized the Boston Literary and Historical Association, which at the time was a gathering of men opposed to Booker T. Washington's views. For a time, he was allied with W.E.B. Du Bois, but Grimké continued to make his own way between the two groups.

Despite earlier conflict with Washington and his followers, in 1905, Grimké started writing for The New York Age, the leading black paper; it was allied with Washington. Archibald wrote about national issues from his point of view, for instance, urging more activism and criticizing President Theodore Roosevelt for failing to adequately support black troops in Brownsville, Texas, where they were accused of starting a riot.

Continuing his interest in intellectual work, he served as president of the American Negro Academy from 1903 to 1919, which supported African-American scholars and promoted higher education for blacks. He published several papers with them, dealing with issues of the day, such as his analysis in "Modern Industrialism and the Negroes of the United States" (1908). He believed that capitalism, as practiced in the United States, could help freedmen who left agriculture to achieve independence and true freedom.

In 1907, he became involved with the Niagara Movement and later with the NAACP, both of which were founded by Du Bois. Men continued to struggle to find the best way to deal with racism and advance equal rights at a time when the lynching of black men in the South continued.

After his daughter graduated from college, Archibald became increasingly active as a leader in the NAACP, founded in 1909. First, he was active in Boston, writing letters protesting proposed federal legislation prohibiting interracial marriages. (The legislation was not passed.) In 1913, he was recruited by national leaders to become the president of the Washington, DC branch and moved to the capital with his daughter Angelina. As president, Grimké wrote detailed accounts of local racial injustices, such as inequitable distribution of educational funds, taking direct action in his community. His brother Francis and his wife Charlotte still lived there.

Grimké led the public protest in Washington, D.C., against the segregation of federal offices under President Woodrow Wilson, who acceded to the wishes of other Southerners in his cabinet. Grimké testified before Congress against it in 1914 but failed to gain changes. He also became a national vice-president of the NAACP. The organization supported the U.S. in World War I, but Grimké highlighted the racial discrimination against blacks in the military and worked to change it.

He fell ill in 1928. At the time, he and Angelina lived with his brother Francis, a widower. His daughter and brother cared for him until he died in 1930.

=== Honors and awards ===
- 1919, the NAACP awarded him the Spingarn Medal for his life work for racial equality.
- In 1934, the Phelps Colored Vocational School was renamed Grimke Elementary School in his honor. The school was closed in 1989, and the building served as headquarters for the Washington D.C. Fire and Corrections Departments until 2012, when the main building was left vacant. The gymnasium has housed the African American Civil War Museum since 2010.

== Marriage and family ==
=== Grimké Sisters ===
By the time Henry began his relationship with Weston, his two half-sisters, Sarah and Angelina, had been gone from Charleston for years. Unwilling to live in a slave society, they left the South and their family and became noted abolitionists and feminists, drawing on their first-hand knowledge of slavery's horrors. Together known as the Grimké sisters, they were active as writers and speakers in Northern abolitionist circles, having joined the Quakers and the American Anti-Slavery Society. After Angelina married Theodore Weld, the three lived and worked for years in New Jersey. They operated a school together. In 1864, they moved to Hyde Park, Massachusetts, a new community outside Boston.

In February 1868, Angelina Grimké Weld read an article in which Edwin Bower, a professor at Lincoln University near Philadelphia, compared Lincoln's all-black student body favorably with "any class I have ever had," with special praise for two students named Grimké, who came to the university "just out of slavery." Stunned, she investigated and found that Archibald and his siblings were her brother's children. She and Sarah acknowledged the boys and their mother, Nancy Weston, as family and tried to provide them with better opportunities. They paid for their nephews' education: Archibald and Francis attended Harvard University and Howard University, respectively, for law. Francis shifted to Princeton Theological Seminary and became a minister. The Grimkés introduced the young men to their abolitionist circles.

=== Brothers ===
Francis J. Grimké did graduate work at Princeton Theological Seminary and became an ordained Presbyterian minister. He married Charlotte Forten, of the prominent Philadelphia black abolitionist family. She was also an abolitionist and a teacher and became known for her diaries, which were written mostly from 1854 to 1864. He headed the 15th Street Presbyterian Church in Washington, DC, for over 40 years. Francis died in 1939.

The youngest brother, John Grimké, did not stay in school. He moved South and had little to no contact with his family for the rest of his life. He died in 1915 in New York City.

=== Marriage and children ===
After getting established with his law practice in Boston, Massachusetts, Grimké met and married Sarah Stanley, a white woman from the Midwest. In 1880, they had a daughter, Angelina Weld Grimké, named after Archibald's aunt. They separated while their daughter was young, and Stanley returned with Angelina to the Midwest when the girl was three. When Angelina was seven, Stanley started working. She brought Angelina back to Archibald in Boston. The couple never reconciled, and Stanley never saw her daughter again; she committed suicide by poisoning in 1898.

In 1894, Grimké was appointed consul to the Dominican Republic. While he held this position, his daughter Angelina lived for years with his brother Francis and his wife Charlotte in Washington, D.C., where Francis was minister of the 15th Street Presbyterian Church.

After graduating from school, Angelina became a teacher and writer. Her essays and poetry were published by The Crisis of the NAACP. In 1916, she wrote the play Rachel, which addressed lynching, in response to a call by the NAACP for works to protest the controversial film The Birth of a Nation. It is one of the first plays by an African American considered part of the Harlem Renaissance. In addition, she wrote poetry, some of which is now considered the first lesbian work by an African American.

== Published writings ==
- Books
  - Charles Sumner, the scholar in politics. New York: Funk & Wagnalls. 1892.
  - William Lloyd Garrison, the abolitionist. New York: Funk & Wagnalls. 1891.
- Pamphlets and articles (most recent first)
  - The shame of America : or, The Negro's case against the Republic. Occasional papers, no. 21. Washington, D.C.: American Negro Academy. 1924.
  - Memorandum submitted on behalf of the National Association for the Advancement of Colored People by Archibald H. Grimke, President of the Washington D.C. Branch, in re equitable provision for the buildings and grounds of the colored public schools of the Capital of the Nation in the Appropriation Bill for 1919. National Association for the Advancement of Colored People. 1919.
  - "The Sex Question and Race Segregation". Papers of the American Negro Academy. Occasional Papers, No. 18-19. Washington, D.C.: American Negro Academy. 1916.
  - The Ultimate Criminal. Annual address. Occasional Papers No. 17. Washington, D.C.: American Negro Academy. 1915.
  - The Ballotless Victim of One-Party Governments. Occasional Papers No. 16. Washington, D.C.: American Negro Academy. 1913.
  - Charles Sumner Centenary. Historical address. Occasional Papers No. 14. Washington, D.C.: American Negro Academy. 1911.
  - "Abraham Lincoln and the Fruitage of his Proclamation". American Missionary. 63 (2): 51–53. February 1909.
  - Modern industrialism and the Negroes of the United States. Occasional Papers, No. 12. Washington, D.C.: American Negro Academy. 1908.
  - "The Heart of the Race Problem". The Arena. 35: 29–32, 274–278, 606–610. 1906.
  - "The Meaning and Need of the Movement to Reduce Southern Representation". The Negro and the Elective Franchise. Occasional Papers, No. 11. Washington, D.C.: American Negro Academy. 1905.
  - "Why Disenfranchisement Is Bad". The Atlantic. 94: 72–81. July 1904.
  - Right on the Scaffold, or The Martyrs of 1822. Occasional Papers, No. 7. On Denmark Vesey. American Negro Academy. 1901.
  - "Abraham Lincoln". Howard's American Magazine. 4 (8): 352–358. March 1900.
  - "Modern Industrialism and the Negroes of the United States". Report of the Hampton Negro Conference. 1899. pp. 46–51.
  - "Open letter to President McKinley by colored people of Massachusetts". Boston. 1899.
  - A eulogy on Wendell Phillips : Delivered in Tremont Temple, Boston, April 9, 1884. Together with the proceedings incident thereto, letters, etc. Boston. 1884.

== See also ==
- Negro Academy

== Further reading (most recent first) ==
- Thomas, Rhondda R; Ashton, Susanna, eds. (2014). "Archibald Grimké (1849-1930)". The South Carolina Roots of African American Thought. Columbia, South Carolina: University of South Carolina Press. pp. 86–92. ISBN 9781611173147.
- Perry, Mark (2001). Lift up Thy Voice: The Grimké Family's Journey from Slaveholders to Civil Rights Leaders. New York: Viking Press. ISBN 0-14-200103-1.
- Bruce, Dickson D., Jr. Archibald Grimke: Portrait of a Black Independent, Baton Rouge, La: Louisiana State University Press, 1993.
- Starr, William W. "Bio of black activist restores his prestige," The State (Aug. 22, 1993), 4F.
