= Francis James Grimké =

American minister (1850–1937)

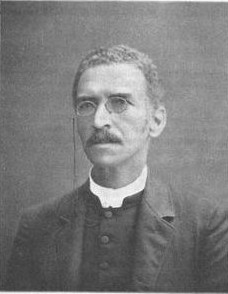
Francis J. Grimké, c. 1902

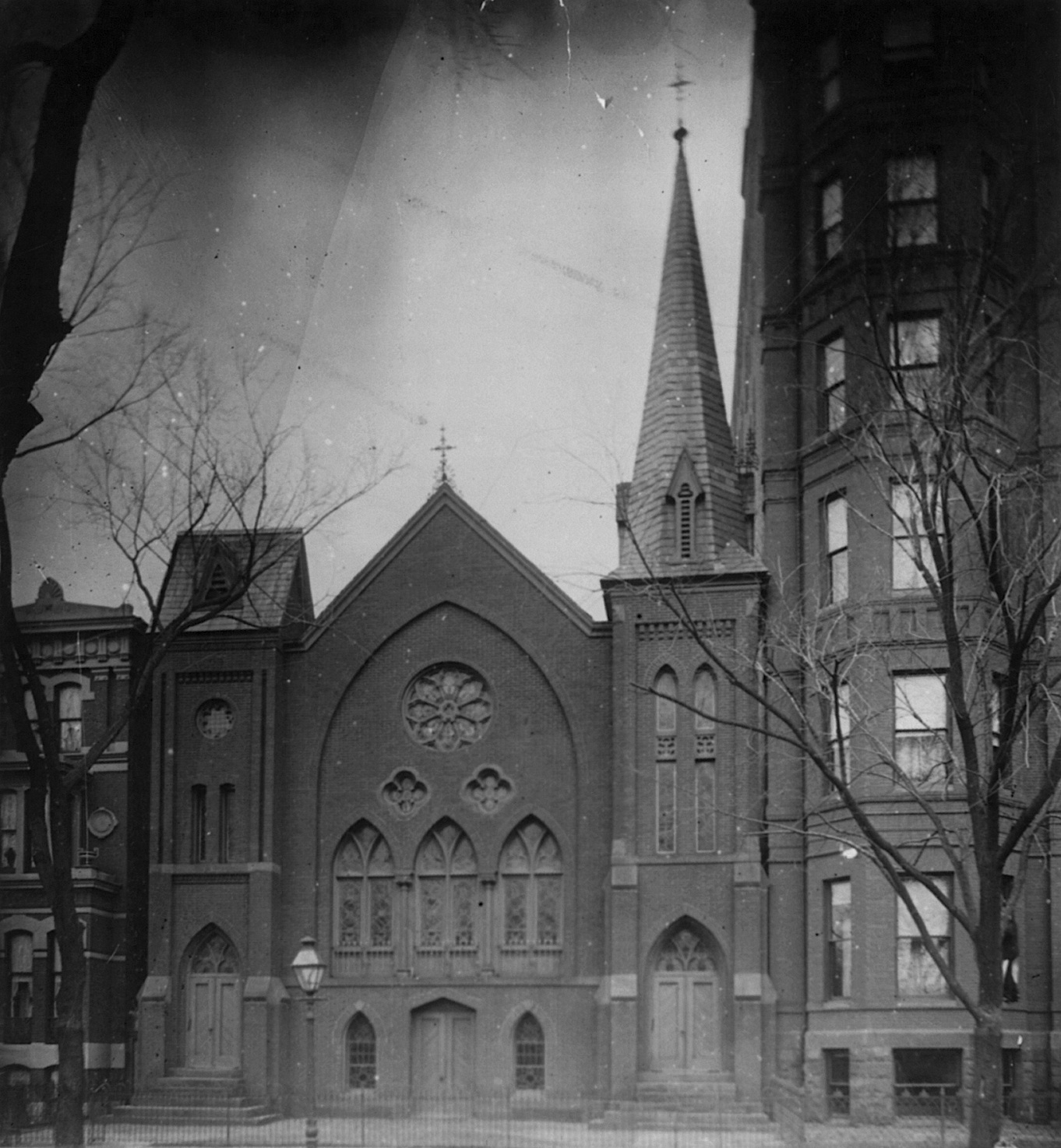
Fifteenth Street Presbyterian Church in Washington, DC, once led by Grimké. The church is shown here as it was in about 1899.

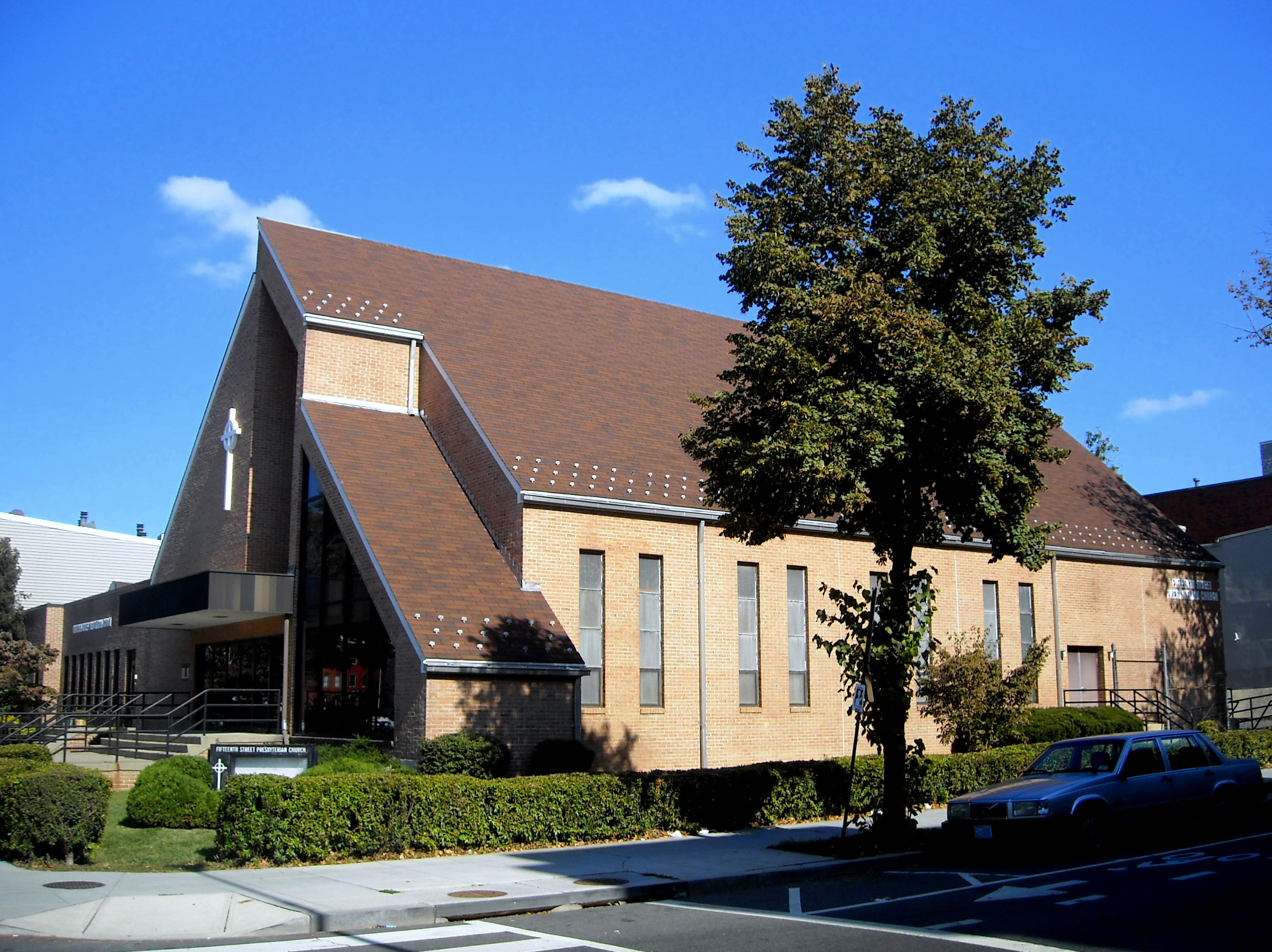
The Fifteenth Street Presbyterian Church today.

Francis James Grimké (November 4, 1850 – October 11, 1937) was an American Presbyterian minister in Washington, DC. He was regarded for more than half a century as one of the leading African-American clergy of his era and was prominent in working for equal rights. He was active in the Niagara Movement and helped found the National Association for the Advancement of Colored People (NAACP) in 1909.

== Early life and education ==
Francis Grimké was the second of three sons born to Henry Grimké, a white slaveowner of Charleston, South Carolina, and Nancy Weston, a slave of European and African descent. After becoming a widower, the senior Grimké began a relationship with Weston. He moved with her out of the city to his plantation, where they and their family would have more privacy. She was his official domestic partner in the house, though she and her children remained slaves. Henry and Nancy gave Francis and his brothers - Archibald and John - their first lessons in reading and writing.

Henry Grimké had come from a large family. Two aunts, Sarah and Angelina Grimké, had become abolitionists. They moved to the free states to join activists there. His other siblings continued to represent and carry out the expected roles, as he mostly did, of their prominent slaveholding family of Charleston.

== Death of his father, American Civil War, and education ==
Henry Grimké died in 1852. As he was dying, Henry willed Nancy, who was pregnant with their third child, and their two sons, Archibald and Francis, to his son and heir, Montague Grimké, by his first wife. He directed that they "be treated as members of the family."

Henry's sister Eliza, executor of his will, brought the family to Charleston and allowed them to live as if they were free, but she did not aid them financially. Nancy Weston took in laundry and did other work; when the boys were old enough, they attended a public school with free African Americans. In 1860, Montague "claimed them as slaves," bringing the boys into his home as servants. Later, he hired out both Archibald and Francis. During the American Civil War, Francis ran off and became a valet for a Confederate Army officer stationed at Castle Pinckney, a jail for Union soldiers. Francis was found and jailed for a time before being returned to Montague Grimké, who sold him to another Confederate officer. Archibald ran away and hid for two years with relatives until after the end of the Civil War. Montague never provided well for his half-brothers or their mother.

After the American Civil War ended, the three Grimké boys attended freedmen's schools, where the teachers recognized their talents. They gained support to send Archibald and Francis to the Northern United States. They studied at Lincoln University in Chester County, Pennsylvania, established for the education of African Americans.

Francis and his brother went through many hardships afterward, as their father had kept them in slavery and not provided for them financially. After the Civil War, which disrupted family fortunes further, Francis and Archibald were enrolled at Morris Street School, part of the Charleston public schools, a segregated system set up for the first time during the Reconstruction Era by a Republican-dominated, biracial legislature. Frank then went North to Stoneham, Massachusetts, where he first stayed with Dr. John Brown and then with Mr. and Mrs. Lyman Dyke. The brothers were then sponsored by Mrs. Pillsbury, sister-in-law of Parker Pillsbury, for higher education at Lincoln University. It was a historically black college founded in Pennsylvania to educate African Americans. They received tuition from a church committee but had no money for books and clothing.

In 1868, Angelina Grimké noted Archibald Grimké's surname in The Anti-Slavery Standard, after his speech was reported. Because of the unusual name, she wrote to learn whether he was related to her family. After learning that he was their nephew and about his brothers, Angelina and Sarah officially acknowledged the three mixed-race boys as family. The sisters supported the three boys while they were in college and opened their home to them. The youngest brother, John Grimké, did not go to school and chose to stay in Charleston with their mother, Nancy Weston.

Francis and Archibald both graduated from Lincoln University in 1870. Francis went on to graduate studies at Princeton Theological Seminary, from which he graduated in 1878. Francis became ordained as a Presbyterian minister.

== Marriage and family ==
In December 1878, Francis married Charlotte Forten, an abolitionist, teacher, and diarist. Charlotte was the granddaughter of James Forten, a prominent member of the free black elite of Philadelphia. Among her acquaintances were many members of the national abolitionist movement, including William Lloyd Garrison, Sarah Parker Remond, John Whittier, and Wendell Phillips. When they married, Charlotte was 41, and Francis was 13 years her junior. In 1880, they had one daughter, Theodora Cornelia, who died as an infant.

== Career ==
Francis began his ministry at the prominent 15th Street Presbyterian Church in Logan Circle, Washington, D.C., a major African-American congregation that was about 15 blocks due north of the White House. He led that congregation until 1885 and was active throughout the community in Washington. He then moved to Woodlawn Presbyterian Church in Jacksonville, Florida, in November 1886, but in January 1889, returned to his former charge.

His elder brother Archibald was appointed consul to the Dominican Republic from 1894 to 1898. Archibald's daughter Angelina Weld Grimké stayed with Francis and his wife during that time. Angelina later became a teacher, prominent writer, and activist in her own right.

Francis was a participant in the March 5, 1897, meeting to celebrate the memory of Frederick Douglass, which founded the American Negro Academy led by Alexander Crummell. He became the organization's founding Treasurer, serving in this capacity until 1919. He played an active role among the scholars, editors, and activists of this first major African-American learned society, which refuted racist scholarship, promoted black claims to individual, social, and political equality, and studied the history and sociology of African-American life.

Except for a few years' sojourn at Laura St. Presbyterian Church (now known as Woodlawn Presbyterian Church) in Jacksonville, Florida, Grimké continued to lead the Fifteenth Street Presbyterian Church in Washington, D.C. until 1928. He died in 1937, more than twenty years after Charlotte.

Francis Grimké said: "Race prejudice can't be talked down; it must be lived down."

== Bibliography ==
- Carol Sears Botsch (February 18, 1997). "Archibald Grimke". The University of South Carolina-Aiken. Archived from the original on September 27, 2007.
- Mark R. Bradshaw-Miller (February 20, 2005). "The Life and Witness of Reverend Francis Grimke". Westminster Presbyterian Church. Archived from the original on September 29, 2007.
- Thomas, Rhondda R. & Ashton, Susanna, eds. (2014). The South Carolina Roots of African American Thought, Columbia: University of South Carolina Press. "Francis Grimke (1850-1937)," p. 117-121.
- Woodson, Carter, ed. (1942). The Works of Francis J. Grimké. Three volumes. Washington, D.C.: The Associated Publishers, Inc.
