= Leighla Whipper =

African American songwriter, music publisher, and fiction writer

Leighla Frances Whipper
- Born: September 2, 1913; Athens, Georgia
- Died: May 2, 2008 (aged 94); Kingston, New York
- Education: Howard University
- Occupations: Songwriter, music publisher, journalist, mystery writer
- Parent(s): Leigh Whipper; Virginia Eva Wheeler
- Relatives: William James Whipper (grandfather); Frances Rollin Whipper (grandmother); Ionia Rollin Whipper (aunt)

Leighla Frances Whipper (September 22, 1913 – May 2, 2008) was an African American songwriter, journalist, mystery writer, and businesswoman. She is best known for arranging and publishing musical scores of calypso and Afro-Caribbean songs, often with collaborator Lionel Belasco.

== Early life and education ==
Leighla Frances Whipper was born September 22, 1913, in Athens, Georgia. Her father, Leigh Whipper, was a stage and Hollywood screen actor, who hailed from a prominent literary and social activist family. Leighla's paternal grandmother, Frances Anne Rollin, wrote the first diary of a Southern black woman published as well as the first full-length biography authored by an African American.

Her mother, Virginia Eva Wheeler, was a stage dancer who performed in chorus lines during the Harlem Renaissance. The couple met through their affiliations with the Theatre Owners Booking Association and work on the vaudeville performance circuit. The couple separated before Leighla's birth. Though absent for much of her childhood, Leigh sent his daughter financial support and Virginia, eventually, sent Leighla to live with her aunt Ionia Rollin Whipper, an obstetrician who operated a home for unwed mothers in Washington D.C. Ionia eventually adopted Leighla.

Whipper graduated from Howard University where she participated in a literary association called the Stylus Club. She was elected Scribe of the Stylus Society during the 1933–1934 academic year.

== Career ==
After college, Whipper lived in New York City and worked as a journalist and editor. She wrote for Adam Clayton Powell, Jr.'s The People's Voice, reporting on Harlem's cultural landscape and reporting on such figures as twin African American photographers Morgan and Marvin Smith. During her time as a journalist, Whipper interviewed Mary Pickford, Lon Chaney, Josephine Baker, and Father Divine.

Whipper also wrote songs featured in Soundies produced for black audiences by African American football pioneer Frederick "Fritz" Douglas Pollard and his Suntan Studios on 125th Street. She worked with Trinidadian calypso musician Lionel Belasco to arrange and copyright, through the Tin Pan Alley music publishing industry, tunes Belasco had heard circulating freely in the islands during his youth. Together, Belasco and Whipper published Calypso Rhythm Songs: Authentic Tropical Novelty Melodies in 1944.

Leighla authored several mystery stories and novels. In 2003, Writer's Club Press published (under the name Lelia Frances Whipper) a memoir entitled The Pretty Way Home.

== Personal life ==
Whipper married sociologist Hylan Garnet Lewis in 1935. The couple had one child, daughter Carole, though Hylan's obituary states they had one son and one daughter. The family separated after Lewis made a solitary move to Chicago to pursue doctoral studies at the University of Chicago. Though the family later reunited in Alabama for a short time, the couple divorced in 1943. After the divorce, Leighla and Carole went back and forth between Washington, D.C., where Ionia lived, and New York, where Leighla's mother, Virginia, resided.

From 1949 to 1986, Leighla co-owned, with her mother, the Spuyten Duyvil, a restaurant in Saratoga Springs popular with the horse racing crowd.

In 1950, Whipper remarried to restaurateur Norman Ford. They remained together until Ford's death in 1961.

During her later years, Whipper lived in the Hudson River Valley and enjoyed playing piano, writing, painting, and crocheting. She died in an accident at her Kingston, New York home, on May 2, 2008.
