= Bossa Nova Bacchanal =

Studio album by Charlie Rouse
- Released: 1963
- Recorded: November 26, 1962 & January 22, 1965
- Studio: Van Gelder Studio, Englewood Cliffs, NJ
- Genre: Jazz
- Length: 35:29 original LP
- Label: Blue Note; BST 84119
- Producer: Alfred Lion

Charlie Rouse chronology
Yeah! (1960)	Bossa Nova Bacchanal (1963)	Two Is One (1974)

Bossa Nova Bacchanal is an album by American saxophonist Charlie Rouse recorded in 1962 and released in 1963 on the Blue Note label. It was the only album Rouse recorded as a leader for Blue Note. The CD reissue includes a bonus track recorded in 1965.

== Reception ==
Professional ratings
Review scores
Source	Rating
AllMusic	4/5 stars
The Penguin Guide to Jazz Recordings	3/4 stars
All About Jazz	4/5 stars

The AllMusic review by Thom Jurek awarded the album 4 stars and stated "Rouse's embrace of bossa nova, as well as other Latin and Caribbean music, is firmly rooted in jazz -- and not American jazz trying to be Brazilian. Rhythmically, Rouse, who is a hard bopper if there ever was one, takes the rhythmic and harmonic concepts of the samba, marries them to Afro-Caribbean folk styles, and burns it all through with the gloriously unapologetic swing of jazz... Ultimately, this is one of Rouse's finest moments as a leader".

The authors of The Penguin Guide to Jazz Recordings wrote: "If you know Charlie Rouse only as a Monk sideman, or from the tribute group Sphere, this will be a pleasant revelation."

Marc Davis of All About Jazz exclaimed: "What a happy record! And what a delightful change from the usual 1960s Blue Note formula." He concluded: "for any fan of happy, infectious, Latin-tinged jazz, Bossa Nova Bacchanal is a must have." AAJ's Joshua Weiner called the recording "a fine album," and noted that "the selection of tunes is perfect."

== Track listing ==
1. "Back to the Tropics" (Leighla Whipper) - 3:57
2. "Aconteceu" (Ed Lincoln, Silvio Rodríguez) - 3:00
3. "Velhos Tempos" (Luiz Bonfá) - 4:50
4. "Samba de Orfeu" (Bonfá, Antonio María) - 6:20
5. "Un Dia" (Margarita Orelia Benskina, Rouse) - 5:56
6. "Merci Bon Dieu" (Frantz Casseus) - 5:57
7. "In Martinique" (Lionel Belasco, Whipper) - 5:29
8. "One for Five" (Rouse) - 7:05 Bonus track on CD reissue

Recorded on November 26, 1962 (1-7) and January 22, 1965 (8).

== Personnel ==
- Charlie Rouse - tenor saxophone
- Kenny Burrell, Chauncey "Lord" Westbrook - guitar
- Larry Gales - bass
- Willie Bobo - drums
- Carlos "Patato" Valdes - conga
- Garvin Masseaux - chekere

On bonus track

- Charlie Rouse - tenor saxophone
- Freddie Hubbard - trumpet
- McCoy Tyner - piano
- Bob Cranshaw - bass
- Billy Higgins - drums
