= Louisa Rollin =

Black woman feminist and civil rights activist

- Born: 1858; Charleston, South Carolina
- Died: Unknown
- Era: Reconstruction Era
- Parents: William Rollin (father); Margaretta Rollin (mother)
- Relatives: Frances Rollin (sister)

Louisa (Marie Louise) Rollin (born 1858) was a feminist and civil rights activist during the Reconstruction era in the United States of America. She, alongside her sisters Frances Rollin and Lottie Rollin, were the most active of the Rollin sisters in reconstruction politics. Louisa was the youngest of her sisters to be politically active.

== Early life, family, and education ==
Louisa was born in 1858 in Charleston, South Carolina, to William and Margarette Rollin, free people of colour. She was the second youngest in her family, including eldest Frances (1845–1901), Charlotte (1847–1928), Katherine (1851–76), and youngest daughter Florence (born 1861).

The Rollin family were considered elite amongst their community in South Carolina, living in a mansion on American Street in Charleston. They were the descendants of emigres who fled the Haitian Revolution (1791–1804). William and Margaretta married in 1844. William operated a successful lumber yard that transported lumber between Charleston and other South Carolina coastal plantations. They sent all their daughters to private, Catholic parish schools for free "colored" people in Charleston.

Louisa along with her sisters was sent to the North for secondary education, and she attended school in Philadelphia. All of the Rollin sisters, with the exception of the very young Florence, remained in the north until the end of the war.

After the Civil War, the family moved to Columbia, South Carolina.

== Reconstruction era activities ==
Louisa addressed the South Carolina House of Representatives in 1869 to urge support for universal suffrage. While there appears to be no direct record of what she said to the House, the New York Times on April 3, 1869, mentioned her actions in an article:

"The speaker was a woman-a mulattress, who is the sister-in-law of the Chairman of the Judiciary Committee, by name, LOUISA RAWLINS [ROLLIN], who obtained some unenviable notoriety several months ago. Her argument (so called) was to the effect that inasmuch as the Constitution did not define the voter as male, the intent and scope of that paper were that sex was unknown to the Constitution, and that, accordingly, women have as much right to vote as men have. She did not ask a new law to be made upon the matter, but only that the provisions of the Constitution be properly enforced by appropriate legislation. Nothing was done further, and the woman-rights agitation ceased there. The end had been attained--the pent-up speech of LOUISA RAWLINS was gotten off, and that was doubtless the original object aimed at when the bill was presented."

Alongside Katherine and Charlotte, Louisa received attention in various local newspapers in Columbia on themselves and their political activism.

== Later life ==
There are few records describing Louisa's life post the Reconstruction era. She, her sister Lottie, and their mother Margretta were living in Columbia, South Carolina, then Brooklyn, New York, after their father passed during the 1880s. The sisters lost most of their wealth and property at the end of the century during the depressions of the 1890s. There are little records of Louisa past her return to Brooklyn, NY.
