= George DeBaptiste =

American abolitionist (1815–1875)

- Born: c. 1815; Fredericksburg, Virginia, U.S.
- Died: February 22, 1875 (aged 59–60); Detroit, Michigan, U.S.
- Occupations: barber, caterer
- Known for: Underground Railroad
- Political party: Republican

George DeBaptiste (c. 1815 – February 22, 1875) was an African-American conductor on the Underground Railroad in southern Indiana and Detroit, Michigan. Born free in Virginia, he moved as a young man to the free state of Indiana. In 1840, he served as valet and then White House steward for US President William Henry Harrison, who was from that state. In the 1830s and 1840s DeBaptiste was an active conductor on the underground railroad in Madison, Indiana. Located along the Ohio River across from Kentucky, a slave state, this town was a destination for refugee slaves seeking escape from slavery.

DeBaptiste moved to Detroit, Michigan in 1846. While Michigan was a free state, refugee slaves often preferred to continue to Canada to get beyond the reach of United States fugitive slave laws. DeBaptiste was considered the president of the local underground railroad group. During this period, he purchased a lake steamboat for carrying fugitives across the Detroit River to Amherstburg, Ontario. Historians have estimated that DeBaptiste and close collaborator William Lambert secured passage of hundreds of slaves, of the estimated 30,000 slaves who settled in Canada.

In the late 1850s, DeBaptiste worked with nationally known abolitionists Frederick Douglass and John Brown. During the American Civil War, DeBaptiste helped recruit black soldiers from Michigan for the Union Army. After the wars he continued to work for African-American civil rights, helping gain admission of black children to Detroit public schools.

== Early life ==
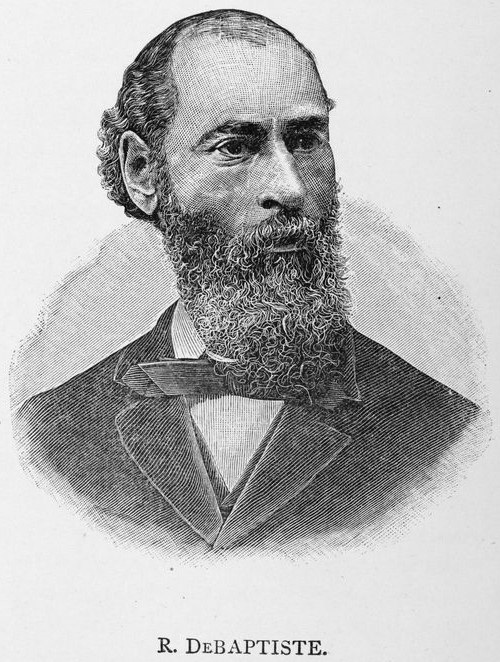
Richard DeBaptiste, George's close relative

George DeBaptiste was born about 1815 in Fredericksburg, Virginia. Different sources identify different parents, and they differ on whether George was born free. The encyclopedia, The Underground Railroad (2015), names John Debaptist and Frances "Franky" as his parents. They were both said to have been born into slavery, but had gained freedom before their son George was born. Because his mother was free, George was born free. Betty DeRamus names George DeBaptiste and Maria as the boy's parents. She said that George legally owned Maria and their son, but set them free on March 12, 1823. William J. Simmons and Henry McNeal Turner, writing in 1887, identified the young George DeBaptiste as brother to Richard DeBaptiste, who became a noted minister in Chicago, and as son of William and Eliza DeBaptiste.

George learned the barbering trade in Richmond, Virginia. In his mid-teens he married Marie Lucinda Lee, a slave, and purchased her freedom with his earnings as a free black person. On January 22, 1835, DeBaptiste obtained a free movement pass for the state of Virginia in the office of Hustings in Richmond, Virginia. It described him as, "a mulatto boy, about five feet seven and a half inches high, and about twenty years of age, who was born free." He later said he used the certificate 33 times to help slaves escape.

== Move to Madison, Indiana ==
As a young man, DeBaptiste moved with his wife to Madison in the free state of Indiana. Around 1836 he invested in businesses. He also began to harbor black fugitive slaves as a conductor in the Underground Railroad. Located along the Ohio River, Madison became a destination for slaves escaping to freedom from Kentucky. It is located nearly halfway between the larger cities of Cincinnati, Ohio and Louisville, Kentucky, both of which are river cities.

DeBaptiste's network of supporters included Dr. Samuel Tibbetts in Madison and William Beard, a Quaker, in Salem, Indiana in Washington County. Catherine White Coffin and Levi Coffin were the superintendents of the ring and arranged relays of slaves to Canada. In February 1840, DeBaptiste, abolitionist Seymour Finney from New York, and William Lambert arranged the noted rescue of Robert Cromwell from a Detroit courthouse, where he was being tried under fugitive slave law after being recaptured by his master. In 1851 an African-American barber named Robert Cromwell had set up a shop in Chatham, Ontario.

=== Valet to William Henry Harrison ===
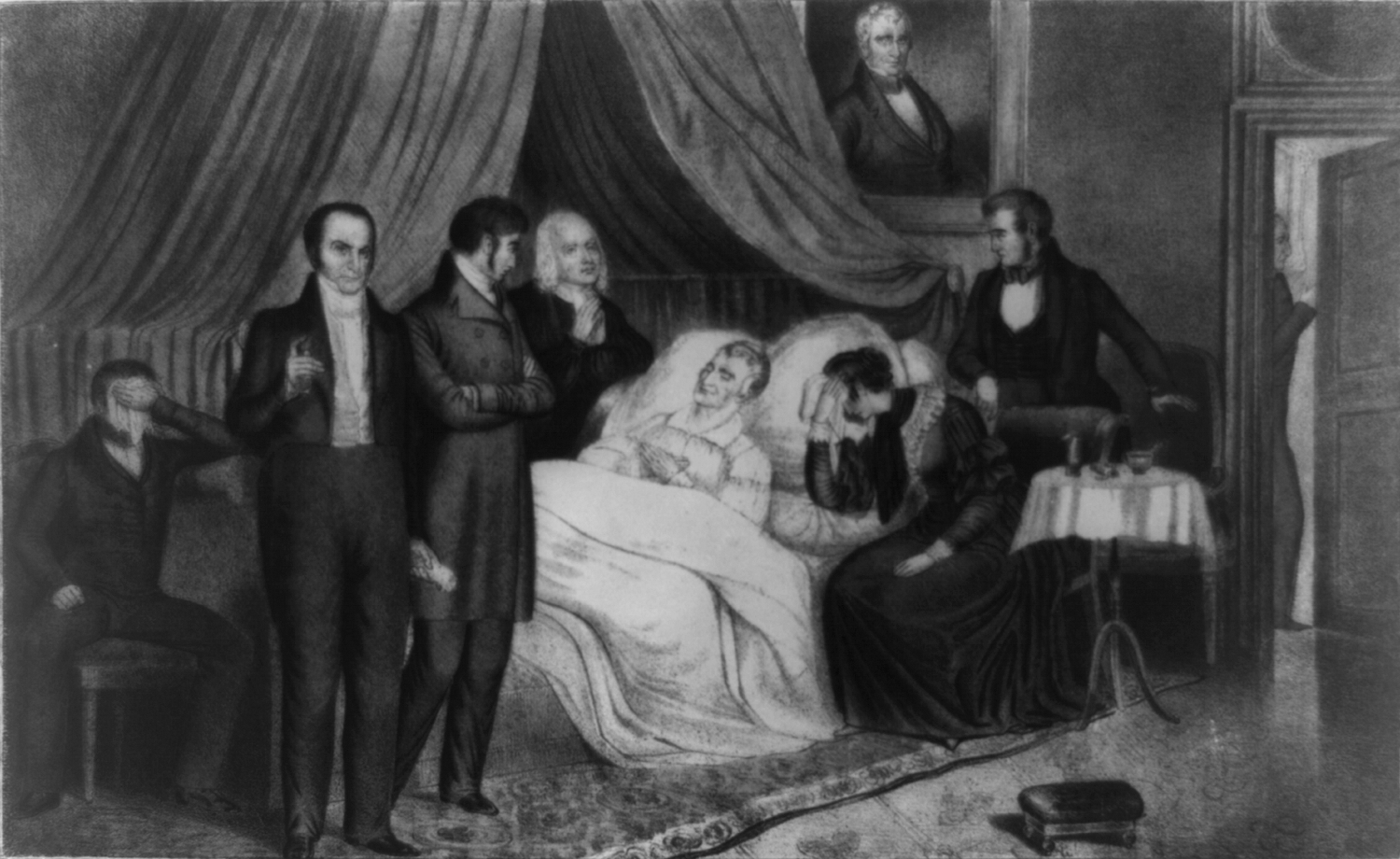
Death of Harrison, April 4, 1841

Before his election to US President, William Henry Harrison was living in North Bend, Ohio. DeBaptiste became his valet during his campaign and, after Harrison was elected president, he appointed the young man as White House steward.

Harrison's term was the shortest of any presidency, as he died of illness after one month in office. DeBaptiste had become very close with the president and cared for him during his illness. An obituary of DeBaptiste said that at Harrison's death, DeBaptiste was at his side and held the president in his arms at his last breath. After Harrison's death, DeBaptiste returned to Madison. His barbershop became "the nerve center" of the Madison, Indiana underground railroad.

=== Fugitives along the Ohio River ===
DeBaptiste was still living in Madison in 1843, when he conducted Adam and Sarah Crosswhite and their four children to freedom. (A few years later he aided them in Detroit, when they crossed the Detroit River into Canada in 1847). About this time, DeBaptiste, Lambert, and Coffin began working with George J. Reynolds. In 1846, DeBaptiste was still working along the Ohio River, ferrying Kentucky runaways across to Ohio and Indiana, and then to Michigan and Ontario, Canada. He frequently loaned his freedom papers to other men of similar height and build. Slavery supporters in the area demanded his arrest for his failure to pay a $500 bond required by the state from free African-Americans until Judge Stephen C. Stevens declared that law unconstitutional. Repeatedly attacked in Madison for his anti-slavery work, as southern Indiana had slavery supporters, DeBaptist was forced to leave town.

== Move to Detroit, Michigan ==
At age 34, in 1846, DeBaptiste moved to Detroit where he continued to work as a barber and also sold clothes at Robert Banks' store. His former comrade William Lambert had also moved to Detroit, and the two men began to work closely together. They were both members of The Order of Men of Oppression and the Order of Emancipation, groups which fought slavery and raised money to aid fugitives. In Detroit, DeBaptiste was considered to be the "president" of the Detroit Underground Railroad, William Lambert the "vice president" or "secretary", and Laura Haviland the "superintendent". Henry Bibb was another important figure in the group. George's relative and possibly brother, Richard DeBaptiste, moved to Detroit from Virginia in 1846 and worked with George there, and in the 1850s in Ohio.

In 1848, DeBaptiste took work as steward on the steamship Arrow, which traveled on the Great Lakes between Sandusky, Ohio and Detroit. In 1859 together with William Whipper, DeBaptiste purchased a lake steamship, the T. Whitney. He could not hold a captain's license, so he hired a white captain named Atwood. The boat ran a similar route to the Arrow. It regularly stopped at Amherstburg, Ontario, Canada to load up on lumber and, presumably, to offload fugitives. Samuel C. Watson worked on the boat as a clerk and part manager.

DeBaptiste's activism extended beyond his work as a conductor. He was an occasional correspondent to various anti-slavery journals, including the North Star and the Liberator. He also played a role in the larger national abolitionism movement. On March 12, 1859, John Brown, Frederick Douglass, William Lambert, and DeBaptiste met at William Webb's house to discuss emancipation. DeBaptiste proposed that conspirators blow up some of the South's largest churches. The suggestion was opposed by Brown, who felt humanity precluded such unnecessary bloodshed. Before emancipation, the state of Kentucky had posted a reward of $1,000 (~$27,884 in 2024) to capture DeBaptiste.

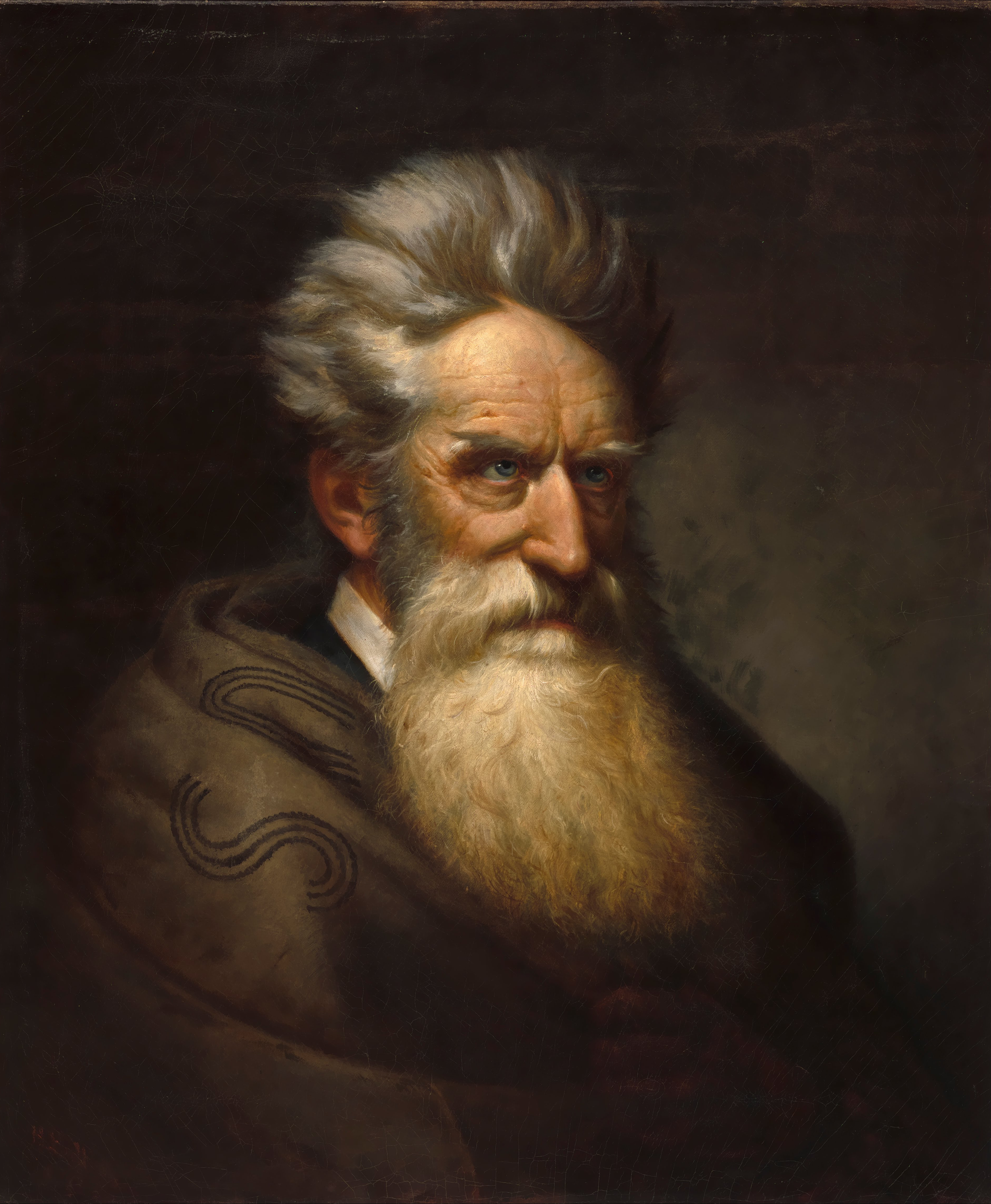
Portrait of John Brown in 1859 by Ole Peter Hansen Balling, painted in 1872

Senator James Murray Mason was the head of the investigating committee against John Brown. After Brown's insurrection, capture, and hanging, Mason attempted to subpoena a "John DeBaptiste", later changed to "George DeBaptiste" in records (probably the subject of this article.) Tasked with serving the warrant, the sheriff of Detroit wrote to the committee: "Knowing the caste and character of DeBaptiste my first impression on receiving the summons was that if Senator Mason knew the facts he would not desire the summons to be served, even if I should find DeBaptiste here... If DeBaptiste were summoned, there is not probability that he would obey..." and the summons was never served.

== Civil war and after ==
During the American Civil War, DeBaptiste worked with Detroit civil rights activist John D. Richards in recruiting Michigan's first black regiment. He also served as a sutler.

After the war, in the late 1860s, DeBaptiste worked with the Freedmen's Bureau. He also opened a catering business in Detroit. He won first prize for his wedding cakes in the 1873 Michigan State Fair.

Continuing to work on civil rights for African Americans, he advocated for the right of black students to attend Detroit Public Schools. He was a member of Second Baptist Church in Detroit. In 1870, he was the first African-American to be elected delegate to the state Republican nominating convention.

== Death ==
DeBaptiste died February 22, 1875. He was survived by his second wife, one son, and one daughter.
