= William Whipper =

African-American businessman and abolitionist (1804–1876)

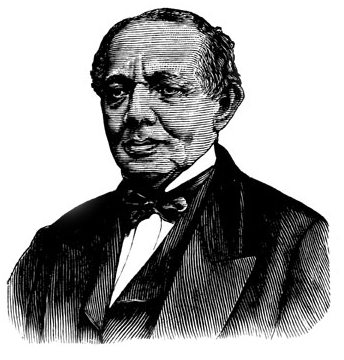
- Born: February 22, 1804; Drumore Township, Lancaster County, Pennsylvania
- Died: March 9, 1876 (aged 72)
- Relatives: William James Whipper (nephew); Leigh Whipper (great nephew); Ionia Rollin Whipper (great niece)

William Whipper (February 22, 1804 – March 9, 1876) was a businessman and abolitionist in the United States. Whipper, an African American, advocated nonviolence and co-founded the American Moral Reform Society, an early African-American abolitionist organization. He helped found one of the first black literary societies in the U.S. known as the Reading Room Society whose constitution stated that its aim was the "mental improvement of the people of color in the neighborhood of Philadelphia." William Whipper epitomized the prosperity that Northern Blacks were able to attain in the mid-19th century.

== Early life ==
Born February 22, 1804, in Drumore Township, Lancaster County, Pennsylvania, to an enslaved African-American house servant and her white owner. William's siblings included, Alfred, Benjamin, Hannah (wife of Stephen Purnell), and Mary Ann (wife of James Burns Hollensworth).

After moving to Philadelphia in the 1820s, Whipper pursued business opportunities. In 1834 he opened a free labor and temperance grocery store. His support of the temperance movement was motivated by liquor's destructive effect on Africa and the belief that alcohol consumption was a contributing factor for Africans selling their own people into slavery. In conjunction with his support for the temperance movement, Whipper began actively participating in the antislavery movement.

== Business career ==
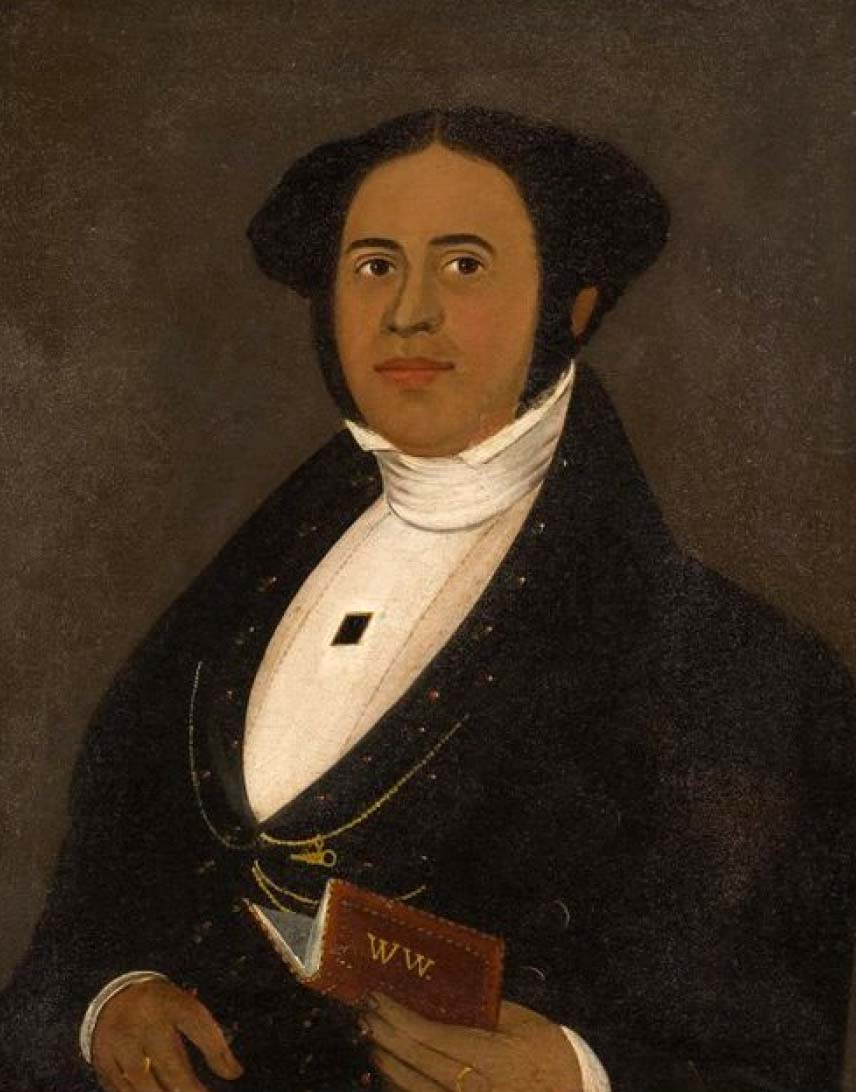
Portrait of William Whipper

In 1835 Whipper relocated to Columbia, Pennsylvania, with fellow black entrepreneur Stephen Smith. The pair created one of the state's premier lumberyards and accrued substantial wealth demonstrating the benefits of northern freedom. Whipper used his newfound wealth to further his personal fight for moral reform and abolition. He utilized his assets to the benefit of the antislavery movement by helping runaway slaves escape to the north. He was also involved in the Philomathean Institute of Philadelphia, a literary organization which included Frederick Douglass, Charles Burleigh Purvis, Mifflin Wistar Gibbs, and Izaiah Weir. His sister Mary Ann married James Hollensworth and settled in Dresden, Ontario, Canada, a final destination on the Underground Railroad. Mary Ann and James were the overseers of William Whipper's investments in Dresden. William Whipper operated a major Underground Railroad station and provided shelter for slaves primarily from Virginia and Maryland, moving them in part in the railroad cars he owned.

== Ideology and contributions to the abolitionist and antislavery movement ==
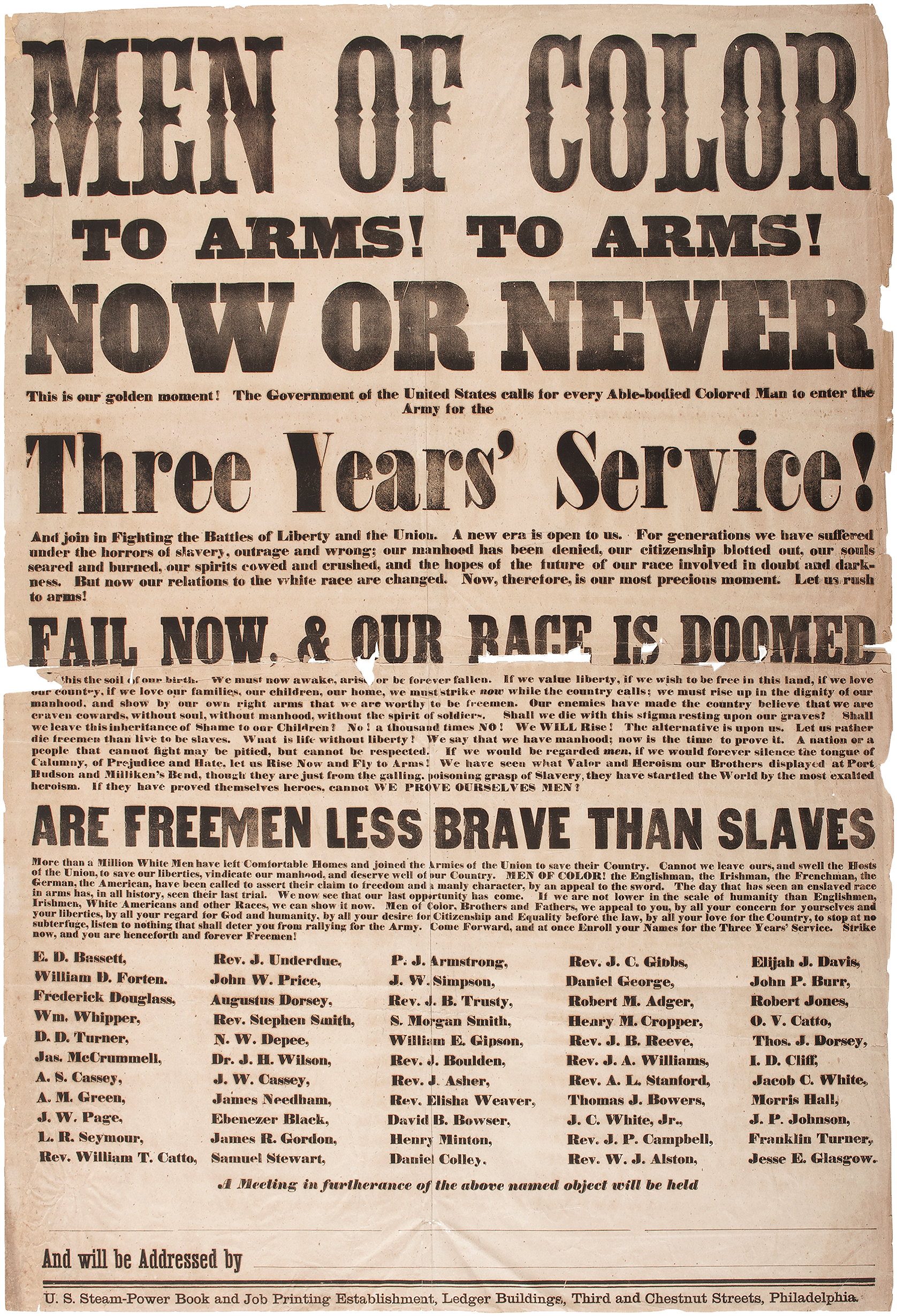
1863 Broadside listing Whipper as a speaker calling "Men of Color" to arms during the American Civil War

Whipper's antislavery ideology was unique and complex. One of his main tenets rested in moral reform. Moral reform refers to the idea that the abolitionist movement "served as a check on the evil dispositions of blacks and inculcated moral principles.

Initially Whipper believed that white prejudice against Black Americans stemmed from the condition in which blacks found themselves, not just the color of their skin. In order to overcome their condition, Whipper stipulated that "blacks had to improve their mental, economic, and moral situations." By making such improvements, blacks would seemingly conform to white standards of living, making social acceptance more attainable.

Another key component of Whipper's ideology was rooted in idea of nonviolence and rational persuasion. At the age of 24, Whipper published his famous essay "An Address on Non-Resistance to Offensive Aggression". This address suggested that nonviolent means of moral righteousness were necessary to encourage a peaceful political movement towards change. This address has been a considered a precursor to what would become some of the same nonviolent strategies followed during later civil rights movements.

Whipper demonstrated his dedication to the notion of moral reform via the creation of the American Moral Reform Society. In Philadelphia in 1835, he attended the annual convention of the Improvement of Free People of Color. He urged delegates to adopt a resolution, which ended the usage of the word "colored". Because of his persistence, the delegates decided to organize a society that would have no racial boundaries. The convention gave birth to the American Moral Reform Society, and gave Whipper credit as a founding father. The American Moral Reform Society attempted to promote general aims such as educating blacks, establishing a black press, and printing histories of the blacks.

Whipper, along with Alfred Niger and Augustus Price, was elected to draft and deliver an address to the American Moral Reform Society that explained the purpose of the organization to the general public. The men declared that "'the depravity of our morals' provoked racial prejudice and claimed that moral reform offered the best means for improving the conditions of black Americans." The speech also called for "the elimination of 'national distinctions, complexional variations, geographical lines, and sectional bounds' in the reform society's conduct.

In the late 1850s and early 1860s, Whipper worked with George DeBaptiste to purchase a steamboat, the T. Whitney, which shipped lumber and escaping slaves between Sandusky, Ohio, Detroit, Michigan, and Amherstburg, Ontario. The ship was managed in part by Samuel C. Watson.

== Family ==
William Whipper married the sister of his business partner Stephen Smith, Harriet Smith (1818–1906) of Columbia, Pennsylvania. A daughter, Harriet, was born in 1837, and appears to have died before adulthood.

He raised a nephew, James Whipper Purnell, as his son. He taught him the lumber business as well as the inner workings of the Underground Railroad. Purnell became a lumber merchant in Chatham, Ontario, and was also secretary to Martin R. Delany while he was planning his back-to-African expedition.

According to the John Brown by W. E. B. Du Bois, James W. Purnell was also a member of the John Brown convention held in Chatham. James Whipper Purnell married Julia Ann Shadd, a cousin of Mary Ann Shadd Cary, in 1864. Their son, Dr. William Whipper Purnell, was a practicing physician in Washington, D.C., and later Oakland, California. Dr. Purnell, a graduate of Howard University School of Medicine, served in the United States Army during the Spanish–American War and the Philippine Insurrection. William Whipper Purnell married Theodora Lee of Chicago, Illinois, granddaughter of John Jones, a tailor, businessman and, before the Civil War, a well known abolitionist. They had one son, Lee Julian Purnell (1896–1983), who was one of the first African Americans to graduate from the Massachusetts Institute of Technology; he took a degree in electrical engineering. He later had a successful engineering practice in Washington, D.C. and was the dean of the engineering department at Howard University for 20 years. His son Lee Julian Purnell Jr. was an electrician and building contractor who, in 1983, survived a 100-foot fall down an elevator shaft at the Forest Glen Station of the D.C. Metro.

African-American educator, author and activist Frances Rollin Whipper was married to Whipper's nephew, attorney William James Whipper. Actor Leigh Whipper was her son.
