= Trials of John Brownfield =

African American tried for murder after his attempted arrest for a poll tax violation

The trials of John Brownfield involved a barber in Georgetown, South Carolina who shot an officer who came to his home to arrest him after Brownfield refused to pay a poll tax. Rumors of a planned lynching drew rallies from black residents. Heavily armed law enforcement officers were called out in response.

He was convicted of murder in 1900 and sentenced to be hanged. He appealed to the South Carolina Supreme Court. Julius L. Mitchell and W. J. Whipper were his lawyers. African Americans were 4/5 of Georgetown's population, but were excluded from the jury. The case reached the U.S. Supreme Court.

Tom Rubillo, a lawyer in Georgetown who has also served as its mayor, wrote a book about the case and its ramifications.
