= Leigh Whipper =

American actor (1876–1975)

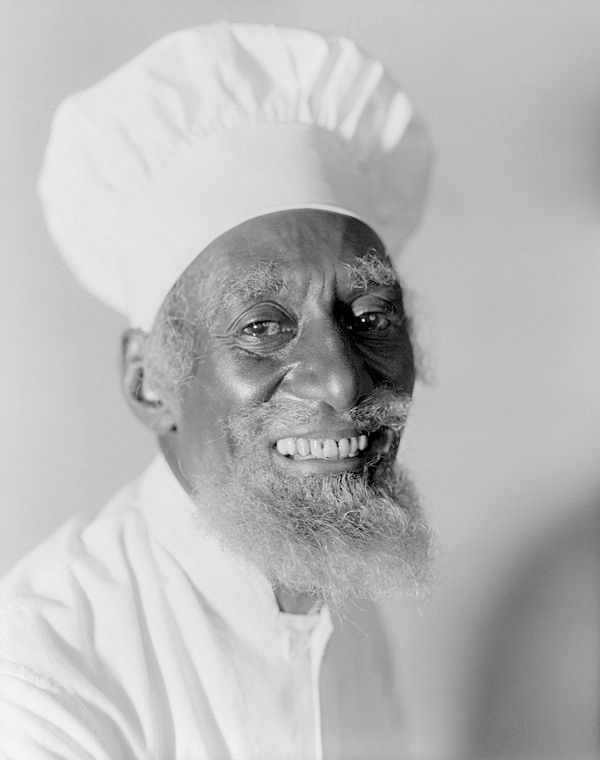
- Whipper as the Crab Man in Porgy (1927)
- Born: Leigh Rollin Whipper; October 29, 1876; Charleston, South Carolina, U.S.
- Died: July 26, 1975 (aged 98); New York City, U.S.
- Education: Howard University
- Occupation: Actor
- Years active: 1899–1958
- Spouse: Lillian E. Myles (m. 1904; died 1946)
- Children: Leighla Whipper
- Parent(s): William James Whipper; Frances Rollin Whipper
- Relatives: Ionia Rollin Whipper (sister); William Whipper (great-uncle)

Leigh Rollin Whipper (October 29, 1876 – July 26, 1975) was an American actor on the stage and in motion pictures. He was the first African American to join the Actors' Equity Association, and one of the founders of the Negro Actors Guild of America. He created the role of Crooks in the original Broadway production of Of Mice and Men, which he reprised in the 1939 film version.

== Biography ==
Whipper was the son of African-American educator, author and activist Frances Rollin Whipper and a nephew of abolitionist William Whipper, attorney William J. Whipper. Educated at Howard University Law School, he left in 1895 and never practiced as a lawyer.

Without any dramatic training, Whipper made his acting debut in a Philadelphia stock theater production of Uncle Tom's Cabin in 1899. He made his first Broadway appearance in Georgia Minstrels. His first film role was in the 1920 silent film The Symbol of the Unconquered.

A portrait of Whipper entitled "Dans un Café à Paris (Leigh Whipper)" by artist Loïs Mailou Jones, oil on canvas is currently on display at the Brooklyn Museum. Quoted from the museum webpage: "The artist’s portrayal of a pensive Whipper answered Alain Locke’s call for black artists to create ennobling representations of African Americans."

During the Second World War, Whipper was a member of the steering committee of Negro Division the Hollywood Victory Committee.

Leigh's daughter, Leighla Frances Whipper, was a Calypso songwriter and music publisher.

== Partial filmography ==
- Within Our Gates (1920)
- The Symbol of the Unconquered (1920) – Tugi – an Indian Fakir
- Of Mice and Men (1939) – Crooks
- Robin Hood of the Pecos (1941) – Kezeye
- Virginia (1941) – Ezechial
- Road to Zanzibar (1941) – Scarface
- King of the Zombies (1941) – Momba
- Bahama Passage (1941) – Morales
- Lady for a Night (1942) – Joe Cupid, the Charm Seller (uncredited)
- The Vanishing Virginian (1942) – Uncle Josh
- Heart of the Golden West (1942) – Rango
- White Cargo (1942) – Jim Fish
- The Ox-Bow Incident (1943) – Sparks (uncredited)
- Mission to Moscow (1943) – Haile Selassie (uncredited)
- Happy Land (1943) – Old Ben (uncredited)
- The Impostor (1944) – Toba
- The Yellow Rose of Texas (1944) – Dock Singer (uncredited)
- Dark Waters (1944) – Minor Role (uncredited)
- Jungle Queen (1945, Serial) – Native (uncredited)
- The Hidden Eye (1945) – Alistair
- The Negro Sailor (1945)
- Young Widow (1946) – Nate (uncredited)
- Undercurrent (1946) – George
- Untamed Fury (1947) – Uncle Gabe
- Lost Boundaries (1949) – Janitor
- The Shrike (1955) – Carlisle
- The Young Don't Cry (1957) – Doosy
- Peter Gunn season 1, episode 2: "Streetcar Jones" (1958) – Lodi
