= The Rollin Sisters =

The Rollin sisters of South Carolina were some of the most influential Black women of the Reconstruction Era. Frances Ann (Frank), Katherine (Kate), Charlotte (Lottie), Marie Louise (Loyise) and Florence Rollin were born in Charleston, but eventually settled in Columbia, South Carolina. These five women influenced the political sphere in spite of their inability to vote or hold political office.

== History ==
The Rollin sisters were born to a free Black couple who belonged to Charleston's antebellum free Black "aristocracy." Very little is known about their mother, Margarette Rollin. William Rollin was a fervent Catholic and insisted that his daughters receive a French education. He was also a wealthy lumber dealer of origin who owned both slaves and real estate. The family had moved to South Carolina from then Saint Domingue during the Haitian Revolution and Slave Uprising.

All of the sisters were involved in Civil Rights activism in some way. Katherine and Charlotte, both known as fierce lobbyists and political brokers, opened a school for freedmen in Charleston in the wake of the American Civil War and Emancipation. Both sisters taught at the school, though they would still be waiting payment for their labor from the government in September, 1873.

Charlotte was also a prominent proponent of full suffrage and rights for women: in March 1869, Charlotte spoke before the state house of representatives to plead for women's suffrage. Later that year, she wrote, "We ask suffrage not as a favor, not as a privilege, but as a right based on the grounds that we are human beings and as such entitled to all human rights." Charlotte also worked as a clerk in the office of Congressman Robert Brown Elliott.

Charlotte and her sisters also organized a "Women's Rights Convention" on December 20, 1870 that was attended by prominent Black and White Republicans. After this convention, the Rollin sisters received a charter for a South Carolina branch of the American Woman Suffrage Association (AWSA). Charlotte was elected Secretary to the SCAWSA later that year, and Katherine was named Treasurer. The SCWRA was a coalition of black men and women working to enact universal suffrage regardless of gender and race. Attended by local activists and state representatives, these meetings were so prominent that they also included the Governor and Lieutenant-Governor. Frances, after being denied a first class ticket on the steamer Pilot Boy due to her color, successfully sued the ship's captain in a military court for a violation of her civil rights. She later published a book, and worked as a law clerk.

In the spring of 1871, two New York newspapers covering South Carolina politics, the Sun and the New York Herald, published long interviews with the sisters. By that time, the sisters had become known for their salon, the "Rollin Salon," which was known as a place of interracial gatherings focused on advancing social causes, including women’s rights. The "Rollin Salon" was also referred to as "the Republican Headquarters" at the time. The Rollin sisters were closely aligned with both white and black radical Republican leadership in the area. The Sun compared the women to Victoria Woodhull, Catherine de Medici, Charlotte Corday and Luise Mühlbach. Also in this interview, Charlotte made clear that she and her sisters did not acquaint themselves with lower-class whites or "scamps" or "ignorant colored people," demonstrating that Charlotte, for her progressive politics, was still influenced by the politics of respectability and classism of the Antebellum Era.

When the Reconstruction Era Republican government collapsed, Charlotte, Louisa, Frances, and their mother Margarette moved North: Charlotte, Louisa and Margarette to Brooklyn, Frances to Washington D.C., where later worked as a clerk for Frederick Douglas. All of the sisters found their previously prominent roles under Reconstruction either threatened or removed by the Southern Democrats. Charlotte also reported fearing attack by the Ku Klux Klan.

The suffrage work of Charlotte (“Lottie”) Rollin, and the activism of all the Rollin sisters, shows the long history of African American women’s political activism outside the Northeast and beyond women’s rights conferences and organizations.
