= Ionia R. Whipper Home =

Organization and residence for girls and women

The Ionia R. Whipper Home is an organization and residence for girls and women in Washington, D.C.. It was established by Dr. Ionia Rollin Whipper (1872-1953), an African American obstetrician and health outreach worker, as a place for unwed mothers.

== Founding ==
Whipper first provided services for unwed mothers out of her Washington, DC home at 511 Florida Avenue, NW.

Along with women from St. Luke's AME Church, she formed the Lend-A-Hand club. The club raised money for the purchase of another property in the area. In 1931, she opened the Ionia R. Whipper Home for Unwed Mothers at its first location. In 1951, the home relocated to 2000 Channing Street, NE.

The Ionia R. Whipper Home accepted women of all races. It was the only facility of its kind to accept African American unwed mothers until the end of segregation in the 1960s.

The Ionia R. Whipper Home became a shelter for at-risk girls and women in 1978.
