= Ionia Rollin Whipper =

- Born: September 8, 1872; Beaufort, South Carolina, U.S.
- Died: April 13, 1953 (aged 80); New York City, U.S.
- Education: Doctor of Medicine
- Alma mater: Howard University
- Parent(s): William James Whipper; Frances Anne Rollin Whipper
- Relatives: William Whipper (paternal great uncle); Leigh Whipper (brother); Leighla Whipper (niece)

Ionia Rollin Whipper (September 8, 1872 – April 13, 1953) was an American obstetrician and public health outreach worker. A 1903 graduate of Howard University School of Medicine, she was one of the few African-American women physicians of her generation. During the mid-1920s, she worked for the United States Children's Bureau; her work there involved traveling the rural South and training midwives to use sterile delivery techniques and to register births.

During a time when maternity homes for unwed mothers were for white women only, she opened her home to unwed mothers of color. Eventually, with the help of donations, she established a separate home for her work with these women, which still bears her name.

== Early life and education ==
Both of Whipper's parents were from African American families which had been free before the Civil War. Her father, the lawyer William James Whipper, moved from Philadelphia to South Carolina after the Civil War, becoming one of the first black judges in Reconstruction Era South Carolina. In Beaufort, South Carolina, he married Frances Anne Rollin. The couple had five children; Ionia was their third child. As a result of marital discord, during the 1880s Frances moved with her children to Washington, D.C., where Ionia grew up among the city's prosperous black middle class.

Ionia Rollin Whipper graduated from M Street High School in 1892, from Miner Normal School in 1893, and from Howard University School of Medicine in 1903 or 1905, as one of four women in her class.

== Professional work ==
Because her mother died before she completed medical school, Whipper borrowed money and worked as a teacher to support her own education. In 1911, she started her own private practice at 511 Florida Avenue NW, where she accepted only female patients. Whipper raised her brother, Leigh Whipper's, daughter, Leighla Whipper, who went on to become a songwriter and music publisher.

Between 1921 and 1929, Dr. Whipper worked for the United States Children's Bureau, which employed her to travel through the rural South educating midwives. When she returned to Washington, she joined the staff of the maternity department at Freedmen's Hospital.

== Charitable work ==
After treating numerous unwed mothers, Dr. Whipper began to offer some of these young women room in her own home. In 1931, together with seven other women from St. Luke's AME Church, she organized a charitable group, the Lend-A-Hand Club, which raised funds to support unwed African-American mothers.

In 1931, with the club's support, she purchased 3.5 acres (1.4 ha) of land in the northwest part of Washington, D.C., where she opened the Ionia R. Whipper Home for Unwed Mothers, which served young women regardless of their race. Dr. Whipper continued to run the home until the early 1950s. Until the 1960s, when similar facilities for whites were desegregated, it was the city's only maternity home that admitted young African-American women. It relocated in 1955 to a different location, and it is still operating today.

== Later life ==
In her later life, Dr. Whipper moved to New York, where she lived with relatives in Saratoga Springs and in New York City. She died at Harlem Hospital on April 13, 1953, and is interred in the columbarium at Fresh Pond Crematory.
