= William Lambert (abolitionist) =

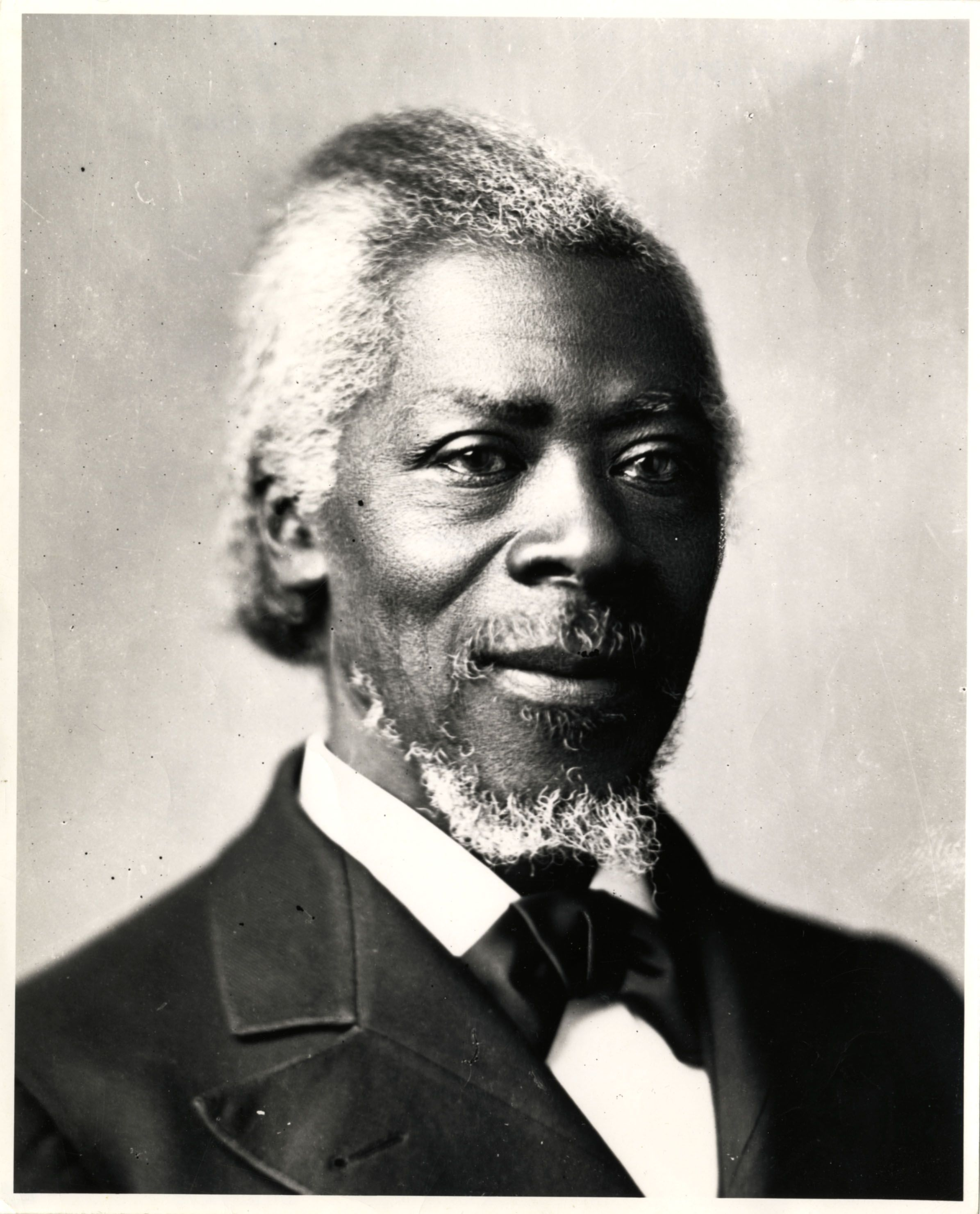
- Born: 1817; Trenton, New Jersey, U.S.
- Died: April 28, 1890 (aged 72–73); Detroit, Michigan, U.S.
- Resting place: Elmwood Cemetery (Detroit), Detroit
- Occupations: Entrepreneur; Abolitionist
- Known for: Work with the Underground Railroad; Work with local civil rights organizations; Co-Founding St. Matthew's Episcopal Church, 1846 (Detroit, Michigan)
- Children: 6

William Lambert (1817 – April 28, 1890) was a prominent African-American citizen and abolitionist in Detroit during the mid to late 19th century. With a formal education and a background in the anti-slavery movement from a young age he would become a significant figure in Detroit's local black community and the city at large for over 50 years. In the late 1840s Lambert's actions in helping a fugitive slave's escape into Canada from Detroit would play a part in the passage of the Fugitive Slave Act in 1850.

== Early life ==
William Lambert was born free in 1817 in Trenton, New Jersey. Sources are mixed on the status of parents, but at least one of his parents was free at the time of his birth, possibly both. Crucial to his later success, Lambert was taken under the wing of a Quaker schoolmaster. This school master, Abner Hunt Francis, provided Lambert a valuable formal education and being an abolitionist himself introduced Lambert to the movement at a young age. In the 1830s the pair found themselves in Buffalo, New York, a rallying point for abolition movement at the time. From 1832 to 1838 while his mentor worked with the local abolitionist movement in Buffalo, Lambert would start making his own way in the world by traveling the Great Lakes region and Detroit by hiring out as a cabin boy on commercial steamers. Sometime between 1838 and 1840 Lambert would settle permanently in Detroit, and though only in his early 20s would quickly involve himself in the local business and civil rights communities.

Lambert's first steady job in Detroit was in a tailor shop. He may have gravitated to the garments industry in part because Francis had been a tailor as well, but it would be there in that shop that he would first meet George DeBaptiste. He and DeBaptiste would become close associates within the local chapter of the Underground Railroad and other abolitionist ventures in Detroit. Additionally Lambert found success in the local garment industry eventually owning his own successful tailoring and dry cleaning business. By the time of this death in 1890, his successes in business would leave behind an estate worth approximately $24,800,000 (2018 USD) when adjustments for inflation and purchasing power parity since 1890.

== Abolitionist work ==
Upon establishing himself in Detroit, Lambert soon involved himself in local civil rights and anti-slavery groups. He had the skills and inspiration to become an organizer in those groups; with his formal education and childhood in the company of abolitionists such as his mentor Abner Francis, Henry Highland Garnet, and even Fredrick Douglas. By 1842 Lambert had reached the foreground in local black politics when he along with two other men formed the Colored Vigilant Committee, which would lobby for the rights and freedom of blacks in Michigan. While not the most senior member of the committee (in any sense of the word), many of the petitions and statements produced by the committee were drafted and delivered by Lambert. One of his earliest platforms was suffrage and notably it appears in some sources that he not only advocated for black men's right to vote, but all that all men should have the right to vote regardless of class or race.

Lambert had gained a platform with his eloquent work in local politics, but it would be in 1847 when he would gain notoriety on a more national level. By this time Lambert had become a conductor in the Underground Railroad and at least one of his businesses served as a safe-house. Then in 1847, a fugitive slave named Robert Cromwell was trying to escape to Windsor in the Province of Canada via Detroit and Lambert's segment of the Underground Railroad. Cromwell was being closely pursued by his owner, John Dun, but Lambert's influence in Detroit by that point was enough to have Dun jailed long enough for Cromwell to escape into Canada. Later while commenting on the success of his lawyers at lobbying for Dun's detention, Lambert would remark that "our law point was bad, but were numerous and resolute". The grounds for Dun's imprisonment were indeed tenuous and he was later released, but it would be too late to recapture Cromwell. Lambert's accomplishment in aiding Cromwell's escape is more astonishing considering not 14 years earlier when a crowd from the local black community tried protesting the recapture of a fugitive slave, it resulted in the mayor calling in Federal troops to disperse the protest. However, the audaciousness of Lambert's tactics in aiding Cromwell and more importantly their success, would cause after shocks that contributed to the Fugitive Slave Act passing three years later in 1850.

== Illness and death ==
For the last few months of Lambert's life he appeared to be suffering some form of neurodegeneration or "incipient softening of the brain" as his doctor referred to it at the time, possibly brought about by old age. In those last few months Lambert started having difficulties being aware of his surroundings, with one anecdote from the obituary noting how he had been found one morning at an old place of business having wandered from his home in the middle of the night. On the night of April 28 after the rest of his family had retired to their beds, William Lambert committed suicide by hanging in the woodshed on his property. It is unknown though speculated as to whether his advanced age and deteriorating lucidity had anything to do with his death.

He would be laid to rest at Elm Wood Cemetery on April 30, 1890, where many of Detroit's other abolitionists were laid to rest including George DeBaptiste, Lambert's long time friend and colleague in the Underground Railroad.

== See also ==
- Civil rights movement (1865–1896)
- List of African-American abolitionists
- List of people from Detroit
