= William Q. Atwood =

American businessman

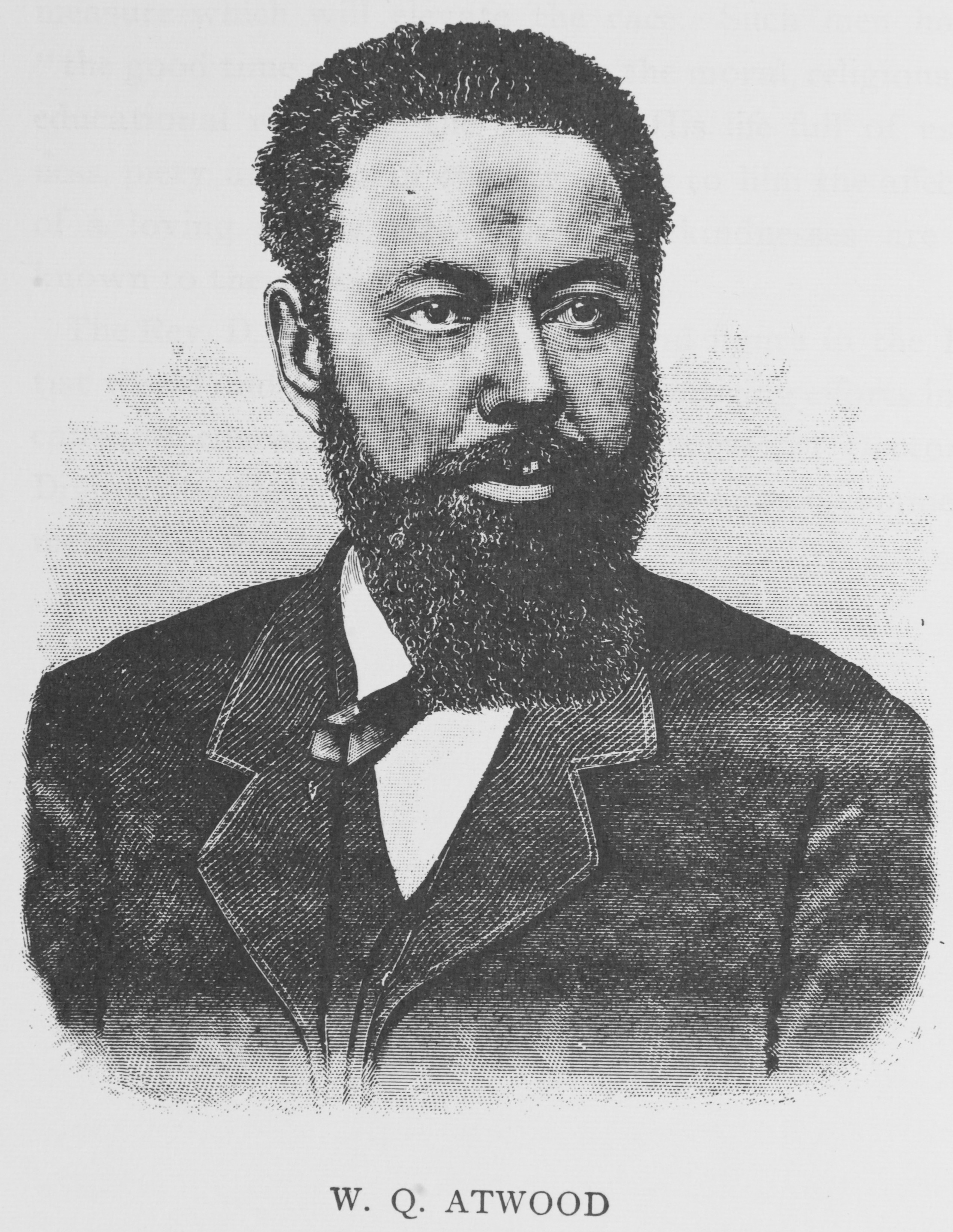
- Atwood in 1887
- Born: January 1, 1839; Wilcox County, Alabama, U.S.
- Died: December 21, 1910 (aged 71); Saginaw, Michigan, U.S.
- Occupation: Lumber baron
- Political party: Republican

William Q. Atwood (January 1, 1839 – December 21, 1910) was a lumber baron in Saginaw, Michigan. Born a slave in Alabama, he was freed in 1853 in the will of his white master and father, and moved to the free state of Ohio. He became active in the Underground Railroad in Ripley, Ohio. During the American Civil War, Atwood moved to the northwest, settling in East Saginaw, Michigan in 1863. There he became successful in real estate and lumber dealing.

Atwood opened a sawmill in 1874. Through his real estate and mills, he became one of the richest African Americans in Michigan. He was active in the Republican party, and served as a delegate to the 1888 Republican National Convention.

== Early life ==
William Quincy Atwood was born a slave January 1, 1839 on the Shell Creek plantation in Wilcox County, Alabama near Prairie Bluff. His white father and master was Henry Styles Atwood, born March 26, 1798. His enslaved mother was born on the Maryland Eastern Shore and reared as a slave in Philadelphia and Alabama. William had a number of brothers, including Julius, John S. David, Olive, and Kossuth. Henry Atwood died in 1853 and freed his slaves in his will.

As a result, William and twenty-one other persons went north, settling in Ripley, Ohio, where he attended a colored school. From 1856 to 1859 he went to Iberia school and later attended Berea College. In the fall of 1859 he went with his brother, John, to California. In California, he worked on steamboats, opened a restaurant, and did some gold mining. John returned to Ohio first, followed by William in the fall of 1861. Ripley was on the Ohio River opposite Maysville, Kentucky, a slave state. Atwood may have been involved in the Underground Railroad active in the area.

== Business career in Saginaw ==
In the spring of 1862, Atwood visited East Saginaw, Michigan, returning to Ripley in the fall. The ongoing American Civil War (1861–1865) made life difficult for a young African-American man who was not a soldier. In the summer of 1863, he returned to East Saginaw where he began land speculating. That year he bought and then sold sixteen hundred acres of land, profiting $4,000 on the deal. This was the start of his success in real estate in Michigan.

In winter 1868 Atwood began working in lumber, making a profit of $6,000 (~$117,454 in 2024) in the following year. He continued to cut one to five million feet of lumber until 1877. He opened a sawmill along the Saginaw River in 1874. He took a short amount of time off, but lumbered in 1880–1882, 1885, and 1886. He marketed his lumber widely, selling wood in Toledo, Cleveland, Dayton, Cincinnati, Columbus, Chicago, Boston, Baltimore, and elsewhere. He was the only black member of the Saginaw Board of Trade. Atwood may have played a role in preventing Saginaw African Americans from joining the Knights of Labor, especially in 1885 when lumber workers in the area struck. In the 1893 Saginaw fire, Atwood lost two houses.

== Civic and political activities ==
Atwood was active in a number of civic and political activities. In 1866, Atwood was the treasurer of the East Saginaw Colored Debating Society. In May 1871, he was a supporter of the new library of the Young Men's Christian Association of East Saginaw. In 1884, Atwood was elected at the Colored Men's State Convention to attend the National Colored Convention at Richmond, Virginia. In September 1886 he was a city ambassador to Grand Rapids.

He was frequently involved in Emancipation Day activities. He was a lifelong Republican and in 1884 was nominated to be delegate-at-large from Michigan to the Republican National Convention. But, only one black man was to be selected and the honor went to Detroit city councilman Samuel C. Watson. and was the first president of the Michigan Protective League formed in 1888. With the support of the league, Atwood campaigned for presidential candidate Benjamin Harrison and served as a Michigan delegate-at-large at the 1888 Republican National Convention in Chicago. The next year, the league put Atwood's name forward for the post of Washington, DC Recorder of Deeds. In 1890, Atwood was again a delegate at a national convention of colored men meeting, this time, in Washington, DC and in 1895 in Detroit, Michigan.

== Personal life, death, and legacy ==
He married Charlotte Echols in Cleveland, Ohio on May 15, 1872. Charlotte was born in Wilkes County, Georgia and was a schoolteacher. They had five children, Willie, Freddie Stiles, Oliver Kossuth, Alice May, and Lottie. Charlotte died in 1895.

Atwood died December 21, 1910, in at St. Mary's hospital in Saginaw of congestion of the lungs. He was buried in Forest Lawn Cemetery in Saginaw.

- In 2002, Atwood was inducted into the Saginaw Hall of Fame
