= Alfred Niger =

Antebellum Black suffrage activist and barber from Providence, Rhode Island

- Born: c. 1797; Old Saybrook, Connecticut
- Died: August 25, 1862; Providence, Rhode Island

Alfred Niger (c. 1797—August 25, 1862) was a free African-American activist who lived in Providence, Rhode Island and worked as a barber. Niger was a leading influential figure in the movement for Black suffrage in early 19th century Rhode Island, during the onset of the Dorr Rebellion.

In 1831, William Lloyd Garrison hired Niger to be an agent for The Liberator throughout Rhode Island. Niger was also an agent for Freedom's Journal in Providence.

== Early life ==
Alfred Niger was born in 1797 to Theophilus Niger and his wife, most likely in Old Saybrook, Connecticut, where he was baptized in 1808. He lived and worked as a barber in Providence, Rhode Island from 1824 to his death in 1862. On November 4, 1827, in Providence, Niger married Julia Bowen. By 1850, Alfred and Julia had at least three children together, Elizabeth, Margaret, and Alexander Petion (after Alexander Petion).

== Black national conventions ==
Beginning in the 1830s, Niger became active in the Black national convention movement. At a Black national convention in Philadelphia in 1835, Niger, along with William Whipper and Augustus Price, was elected to draft and deliver an address to the American Moral Reform Society that explained the purpose of the organization to the general public.

The men declared that "'the depravity of our morals' provoked racial prejudice and claimed that moral reform offered the best means for improving the conditions of black Americans." The speech also called for "the elimination of 'national distinctions, complexional variations, geographical lines, and sectional bounds' in the reform society's conduct.

== Rhode Island Anti-Slavery Society ==
Beginning in the early 1830s, Niger served as a Providence delegate to the New England Anti-Slavery Society, led by William Lloyd Garrison. In 1836, Niger with other Rhode Islanders created the Rhode Island Anti-Slavery Society (RIASS). Niger was only one of two men in the organization. According to historian CJ Martin: "From then until the end of the suffrage movement, the RIASS was to be Black Providence leaders’ most powerful ally –- likely because of Niger's leadership within it." By 1837, Niger had become a member of the RIASS’s powerful Executive Committee. Martin writes: "He undoubtedly had a hand in writing the committee’s resolutions that year, two of which were dedicated to prioritizing, concurrently to ending slavery in the South, the idea that all distinctions of color, which were infringements on the Declaration of Independence’s ideas about equality in mankind, should be abolished."

In 1846, Niger served as a Providence delegate to the American Anti-Slavery Society.

== Black suffrage movement ==
According to historian Stanley Lemons, the Black community of Providence, Rhode Island was disorganized until the 1820s, and by the 1830s had developed "a vital community life ... complete with churches, schools, fraternal societies, businesses, and reform organization." Lemons points to the opening of the African Union Meeting House in 1820 as beginning this period of significant development.

Lemons writes; "Working against great obstacles and without aid, Negroes slowly built up modest business and financial holdings. By 1841, these included grocery stores, shoe repair shops, and second hand clothing stores. In 1822 the total worth of black property was approximately $10,000 (~$296,643 in 2024). By 1839 the estimate ranged between $35,000 and $50,000. ... Most amazing, two-thirds of the Negroes in Providence lived in their own homes."

It was in this environment that Niger both owned his own home and developed his own business as a barber in early 19th century Providence, Rhode Island. When the City of Providence sought to levy taxes on the increasing amounts of Black-owned property, the Black community reacted by arguing that it was taxation without representation. At a protest meeting at the African Union Meeting House, Niger was elected to be its secretary, and George C. Willis its chairman. Both Niger and Willis were known to be collaborators of William Lloyd Garrison, and thus were connected to the antislavery movement.

== Dorr Rebellion ==
Following the American Revolution, unlike most nascent states, Rhode Island maintained its royal charter, originally approved in 1663 by King Charles II. As a result, since the charter restricted the right to vote solely to men who owned property, by the early 19th century, large numbers of Rhode Island male citizens did not have the right to vote. These two sides eventually formed two parties, the Suffrage Party, and the Legal Party, which opposed expanding the right to vote under a new constitution, and thus maintain power.

By 1841, the Suffrage Party began to organize a call for a convention to draft a new state constitution, led by Thomas Wilson Dorr; they became known as "Dorrites." As they began to organize, it became clear that they would have to confront the issue of Black suffrage. Property-owning Black men had been able to vote in Rhode Island until a law made it illegal in 1822. In August 1841, as the Dorrites began to form the People's Convention, Alfred Niger tried to exploit a loophole in the rules for electing delegates. According to historian Van Gosse, the rules did not specify that only whites could vote. Nevertheless, Niger was turned away. Gosse writes that the Legal Party "broadcast this exclusion to lambaste the Dorrites' 'democratic' bad faith".

At a meeting of the Suffrage Party in Providence on September 27, 1841, nominations were made for the office of treasurer. Alfred Niger was one of those nominated. Historian Irving Bartlett writes that: "Acting upon a suggestion from the floor that Mr. Niger was a Negro, the Suffragists voted not to receive the majority report and the meeting immediately fell into confusion. Mr. Field, the man who was instrumental in bringing in Niger's nomination, finally rose to explain his action. His opposition to Negro suffrage was well-know[n], he said, and he brought the subject to the floor only 'in order that it might be finally decided upon by the Association.' In other words, Field wanted to know how many pro-Negro men were in his party."

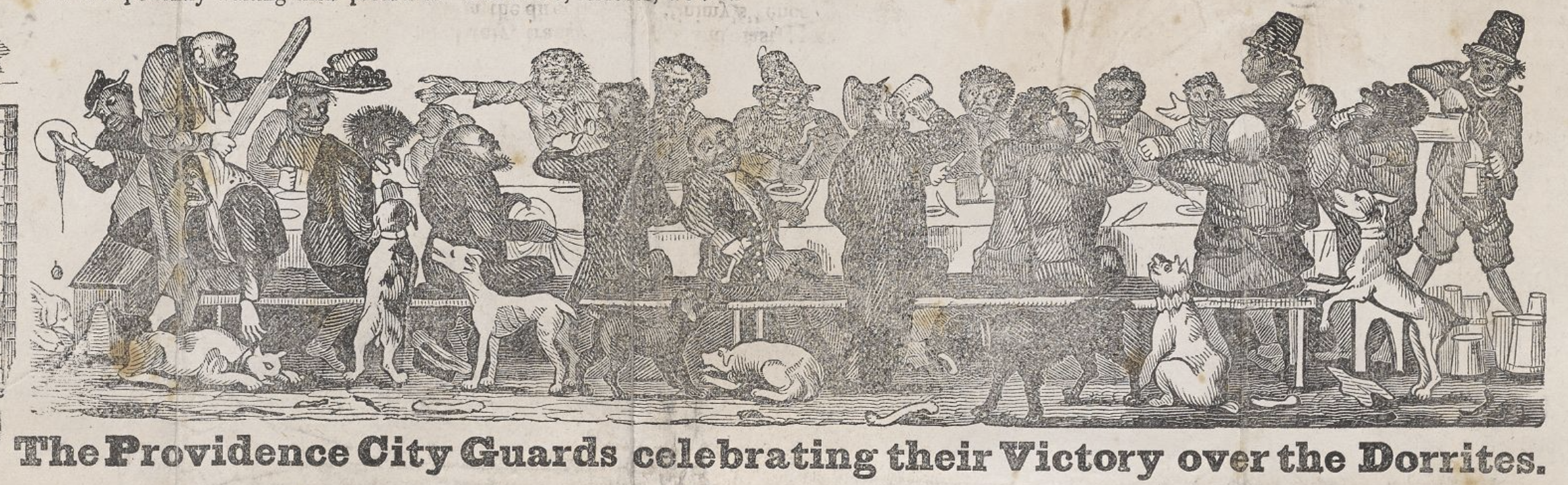
Excerpt from "Governor King's Extra: Dedicated to His Excellency without permission," Riders Broadsides, 1842

A motion to strike "white" was introduced at the convention, but was defeated, 46–18. After this, many Black men and white abolitionists who left the Suffrage Party joined the side of the Legal Party, and hundreds of Black men joined Providence's home guard in the summer of 1842. In November 1842, Rhode Island's new constitution, written by the General Assembly, was ratified, and extended the right to vote to "all native [male] citizens of the United States." This may make Rhode Island the first state to offer Black male suffrage in the United States.

== Later life and death ==
According to historian CJ Martin, "Niger’s sons followed in their father’s footsteps by becoming professionals in Providence’s Black community. Alexander became, according to one historical account of the Providence print industry, the first Black man to work in printing in the city. He probably also became the first Black member of a typographical union in Providence when he was one of its founding members in 1857."

Alfred Niger died on August 25, 1862, in Providence, Rhode Island. He is buried in the Locust Grove Cemetery in Elmwood, Providence, Rhode Island.
