= Charlotte Rollin =

American activist and suffragist (c. 1847–1928)

Charlotte "Lottie" Rollin
- Born: c. 1847; Charleston, South Carolina
- Died: 1928 (aged 80–81); Brooklyn, New York
- Education: Dr. Dio Lewis's School for Young Ladies; Institute for Colored Youth
- Occupations: Political and civil rights activist, suffragist, feminist
- Organization: American Woman Suffrage Association
- Relatives: Frances Rollin Whipper, Kate Rollin, Louisa Rollin, Florence Rollin (see: The Rollin Sisters)

Charlotte M. Rollin (c. 1847–1928) was an American political and civil rights activist, suffragist, and feminist. Rollin, along with her five sisters, Frances Anne, Kate, Louisa, and Florence, became well known for their political activism in South Carolina and nationally during the period of Reconstruction. Lottie Rollin was chair of the South Carolina American Woman Suffrage Association and the Rollin Sisters were said to be 'among the most influential lobbyists and power brokers in South Carolina during Reconstruction'.

== Early life and education ==
Charlotte Rollin was born and raised in Charleston, South Carolina, one of five daughters born to Margarette and William Rollin, a prosperous Catholic lumber dealer and free African-American. The daughters were descendants emigres who fled the Haitian Revolution, a successful slave revolt, in the late eighteenth century. All of the daughters received a good education, and Rollin and her sisters, Frances, Katherine and Louisa, would all become influential suffragists at both the state and national levels.

William Rollin hired tutors for his daughters, as well as sending them to South Carolina private schools. To continue her education Rollin, like her sisters, went north. She briefly attended Dr. Dio Lewis's Family School for Young Ladies in Boston, and around 1860 went to Philadelphia, where she studied at the Institute for Colored Youth. Rollin was reportedly fond of poetry, particularly Lord Byron, Elizabeth Barrett Browning, and John Greenleaf Whittier, who she called 'the poet of human liberty and the rights of mankind.'

Although previously wealthy and locally prominent, the Civil War had a major impact on the wealth and property of William Rollin. In 1867, the sisters moved to Columbia, South Carolina, where they became influential figures within Reconstruction politics in the state.

== Work for women's suffrage ==
Rollin was a member of the American Woman Suffrage Association (AWSA), along with her sisters Louisa and Frances, and other prominent suffragists including Frances Harper, Charlotte Forten Grimké, Josephine St. Pierre Ruffin, and Sojourner Truth.

In 1870, Rollin was the elected Secretary of the AWSA affiliated South Carolina Woman's Rights Association, and subsequently led a meeting at the state capital of Columbia advocating for women's suffrage. She declared:

We ask suffrage not as a favor, nor as a privilege, but as a right based on the ground that we are human beings, and as such entitled to all human rights... until woman has the right of representation... other rights will be held by insecure tenure.

Her speech has been claimed as the first published argument for African-American women's suffrage. Rollin was also the first South Carolina delegate to a national woman suffrage convention.

== Later life ==
As early as 1871, Rollin expressed her intention to move to Brooklyn, in fear of the activities of the Ku Klux Klan. By late 1880, Rollin and her sister Louisa were running a boarding house in Brooklyn. She is presumed to have deceased in Brooklyn.

== See also ==
- The Rollin Sisters
