= Harriet Lincoln Coolidge =

American philanthropist, author, reformer

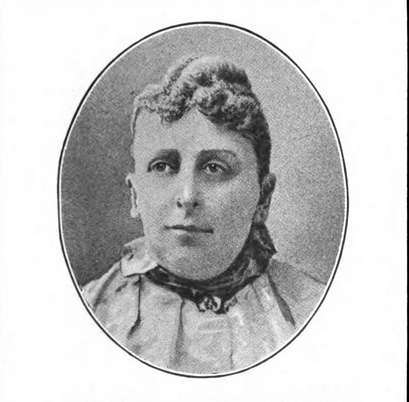
- Photo in A Woman of the Century
- Born: Harriet Abbott Lincoln; 1849; Boston, Massachusetts, U.S.
- Died: May 17/18, 1902; Baltimore, Maryland, U.S.
- Occupations: Author, philanthropist, reformer
- Spouse: George Austin Coolidge (m. 1872)
- Children: 4
- Relatives: Frederic W. Lincoln (father)

Harriet Abbott Coolidge (née Lincoln; 1849 - May 17/18, 1902) was an American philanthropist, author and reformer. She did much in the way of instructing young mothers in the care and clothing of infants, and furthered the cause to improve the condition of infants in foundling hospitals. She contributed a variety of articles on kindergarten matters to the daily press, and while living in Washington, D.C., she gave a series of "nursery talks" for mothers at her home, where she fitted up a model nursery. Coolidge was the editor of Trained Motherhood, as well as the author of In the Story Land, Kindergarten Stories, Talks to Mothers, The Model Nursery, and What a Young Girl Ought to Know. She was one of the original signers of the Society of the Daughters of the American Revolution, and was an active member of four charity organizations in Washington.

== Early life and education ==
Harriet Abbott Lincoln, born in Boston, Massachusetts, was the daughter of Frederic W. Lincoln and Emmeline (Hall) Lincoln. Her parents married in May 1848, and she was born before her mother died in July 1849. Frederic was called the War Mayor of Boston, as he held that office all through the American Civil War and was reelected and served seven years.

Her great-grandfather, Amos Lincoln, was a captain of artillery and one of the intrepid band who, in 1773, consigned the tea to the water in Boston harbor. He was in the battle of Bunker Hill, attached to Stark's brigade, in action at Battle of Bennington, Battle of Brandywine, and Battle of Monmouth, and aided in the suppression of Shays' Rebellion, and was also one of Governor John Hancock's aids. On June 14, 1781, he was married to Deborah, a daughter of Paul Revere, which made Coolidge a great-great-granddaughter of his. Amos Lincoln's first ancestor in the US was Samuel Lincoln, of Hingham, Massachusetts, one of whose sons was Mordecai Lincoln, the ancestor of President Abraham Lincoln.

Coolidge was delicate in childhood, and her philanthropic spirit was early shown in flower-mission and hospital work in Boston. Her childhood was passed as a neighbor of Louisa May Alcott, Oliver Wendell Holmes Jr., Thomas Bailey Aldrich, Edwin Percy Whipple, and James T. Fields. For several years, she was instructed at home, and she was sent to Dr. Dio Lewis's School for Young Ladies, of Lexington, Massachusetts.

== Career ==
In November 1872, she married George Austin Coolidge, a publishing agent of Boston. After having four children, Coolidge devoted herself to motherhood, studying the best methods of infant hygiene. She soon began a series of illustrated articles for the instruction of mothers in a New York City magazine, and while residing in that city, studied for three years and visited the hospitals for children.

Ill health obliged her to return to Washington, D.C., where, before going to New York, she was interested in charities and hospitals for children. Meeting the mothers of both the rich and the poor, and seeing the great need of intelligent care in bringing up little children, she began a large correspondence with others. Her devotion to the children of the Foundling Hospital in Washington, and the great hygienic reformation she brought about, gave that institutional record of no deaths among its residents during the six months she acted as a member of its executive board of officers. Frequent inquiries from mothers desiring information on hygienic subjects relating to children suggested the idea of a series of nursery talks to mothers and the fitting up of a model nursery in tier residence, where every accessory of babyhood could be practically presented. "Nursery Talks" were inaugurated by a "Nursery Tea," and 500 women from official and leading circles were present. Classes were formed, and a paid course and a free one made those lectures available for all desiring information. Even into midsummer, at the urgent request of mothers, Coolidge continued to give her mornings to answering questions. She remained in Washington during the summer, guiding those who did not know how to feed their infants proper food, and, as a consequence, her health was impaired, and she was obliged to give up her nursery lectures until her health was restored. She then commenced a scientific course of hygienic study, and was made president of the Woman's Clinic, where women and children were treated by women physicians.

Coolidge was an active member of four of the leading charity organizations in Washington, a member of the Woman's National Press Association and devoted to every movement in which women's higher education was considered. On October 11, 1890, at the Strathmore Arms, she was one of the original signers of the Society of the Daughters of the American Revolution. She also served as chairman of the School Suffrage Committee.

Coolidge's book, In the story land, contained stories for the kindergarten, the school, and the home. It was made up from three smaller volumes, which sold separately in boards at 25 cents each. Some of the stories included: "Little Black Fairy" (Coal), "Mother Willow and Her Friends," "The Discontented Raindrop," "Little Bed Cap" (Squirrel), "The Violet and Nutshell," "The Rose Club," "How the Fairies Came" (Rainbow colors), "Dear Little Brownie" (Chestnut), "Little Yellow and His Brothers and Sisters" (Maple leaf).

== Personal life ==
She married George Austin Coolidge in 1872. The couple had four children. A daughter, Emelyn Lincoln Coolidge (b. Boston, August 9, 1873), was a pediatrician.

Harriet Lincoln Coolidge died on either 17 or 18 May 1902 at Johns Hopkins Hospital in Baltimore, Maryland, after having been rushed there from Washington, D.C. suffering from acute bronchitis.

== Selected works ==
- In the story land : a series of original and instructive stories for the kindergarten, the school and the home, 1895
- The man who made the well, 1899
- A talk with the children, 1899
- What the little sunbeams saw, 1899
