= Samuel C. Watson =

American doctor and politician

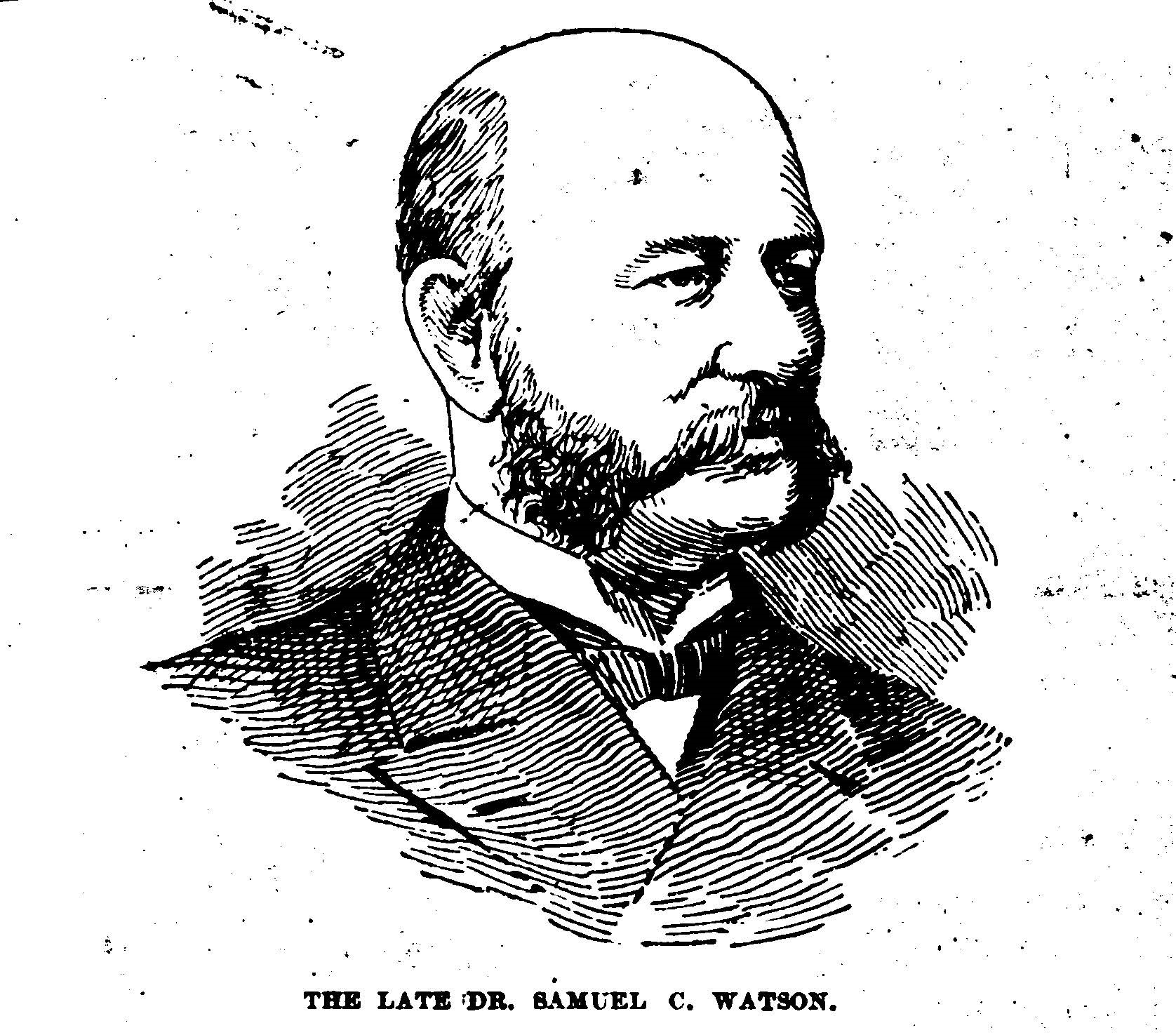
- Drawing of Dr. Samuel C. Watson.
- Born: c. 1832; St. James Parish, South Carolina
- Died: March 13, 1892 (aged 59–60); Detroit, Michigan
- Education: Western Homeopathic College; University of Michigan
- Occupations: Politician, druggist, doctor
- Political party: Republican, later Democratic

Samuel C. Watson (c. 1832 – March 13, 1892) was a druggist, medical doctor, and civic leader in Detroit, Michigan, and Chatham, Ontario. In the late 1850s and early 1860s, Watson was a part of the Detroit–Chatham Underground Railroad and closely connected with William Whipper and George DeBaptiste. During the American Civil War (1861–1865), Watson settled in Detroit, where he would eventually become a city councilman. He was politically independent, and found himself on opposite sides of debates with DeBaptiste and other Michigan blacks, and he switched from the Republican to the Democratic party in the mid-1880s.

== Early life ==
Samuel C. Watson was born a slave in about 1832 in St. James Parish, South Carolina. When he was nine years old, his master died and he was sent with two brothers and two sisters to Washington, D.C., under the guardianship of Rev. William McLane, a Presbyterian preacher. He had already begun some education, and in Washington, he attended a school led by Octavia Colston Grimes, the wife of abolitionist and Underground Railroad conductor Leonard Grimes. He then attended Union Seminary led by John F. Cook. At the age of sixteen, he enrolled at Phillips Academy in Andover, Massachusetts, where he studied for three years, one year in the classical department, before dropping out. The next spring, he joined the crew of the survey schooner USS Madison at Brooklyn Navy Yard where he took part in surveys between Delaware Bay and Portland, Maine. The ship returned to New York, and Watson was discharged. He then followed his brothers and moved to Ohio and enrolled at Oberlin College. He again did not finish his studies, opting instead in 1853, to transfer to the Medical Department at the University of Michigan in Ann Arbor, Michigan. He left that school in 1856, moving to Cleveland, Ohio, to finish his studies at the Western Homeopathic College where he graduated in the winter of 1856, and was granted an M. D. in 1857. He then moved to Chatham, Ontario, where he practiced medicine until the fall of 1858. In Chatham, his offices were on the Charity block on King and Adelaid Streets owned by James Charity and also containing the offices of the Provincial Freeman run by Mary Ann Shadd.

== Canada ==
In the fall of 1858, he moved to British Columbia, following a gold rush there. Unsuccessful, he returned to Chatham the next fall. In 1859, he joined the steamboat the T. Whitney co-owned by abolitionists William Whipper and George DeBaptiste and run by DeBaptiste which shipped lumber and escaped slaves between Sandusky, Ohio, Detroit, Michigan, and Amherstburg, Ontario. In the winter of 1861, he married Sarah L. Cassey, the only daughter of Joseph and Ann Cassey in Salem, Massachusetts, and the couple settled in Toronto, where Watson was licensed to practice medicine.

== Detroit ==
In 1863, Watson moved to Detroit, where he opened a drug store, which he ran until his death in 1892, although he was prohibited from practicing medicine there. His first wife, Sarah, died in 1875. The couple had six children, three of whom died in childhood. In 1877, he married again, to Camilla Coleman, the daughter of M. F. Coleman of Philadelphia. The couple had two children.

== Public career ==
Watson became involved in Republican politics and in 1874, was president of the Detroit Political Union, an African American political action group which opposed the political efforts of George DeBaptiste, John D. Richards, and Walter Y. Clark. That year, Watson was nominated to the state legislature, but lost in the election. In 1875, he was nominated to the Board of Estimates, but again lost due to a ballot irregularity involving a misspelling of Watson's name as Samuel G. Watson rather than Samuel C. Watson. Since parties supplied their own ballots, Detroit blacks charged that the misspelling represented a betrayal of Watson by Republicans. His democratic opponent, M. J. Mills, refused the nomination and the alderman voted Watson to the seat. In 1876, he was again nominated to the state legislature and again lost. In 1883, he was nominated to the city council and was elected to the three-year term.

He was chosen a state delegate-at-large for the 1884 Republican National Convention, favoring James G. Blaine for president, but who would lose in the general election to Grover Cleveland. Watson was politically independent minded, and his selection as a delegate was disputed, with Saginaw lumber baron William Q. Atwood the other candidate to represent black Michiganders. Watson along with Obadiah C. Wood feuded with Albert W. Hill, and when Watson term in the city council ended, he was not put up for a second term. When Watson's term in the city council ended, he requested and was promised a seat in the assessor's office, but in the end, was not appointed. About that time, he left the Republican party, and in 1888, Watson wrote an article published in the Detroit Free Press in support of independent politics and questioning the Republican Party's support for civil rights. He formed the Independent Colored Democratic Club and was a member of the Jacksonians club. In 1892, he supported Grover Cleveland in the presidential election. In 1891, he was appointed to the Jury Commission by Michigan Governor Edwin B. Winans.

Watson was also active in civic affairs. In 1884, he was honorary commissioner for the State of Michigan to the colored department of the World's Fair, the World Cotton Centennial in New Orleans. He was loosely connected to the Congregational denomination of the Christian church.

== Death ==
Watson became very sick with the flu in the winter of 1890–1891, but recovered. In late February or early March 1892, he was again ill, and on March 13, 1892, Watson died of pneumonia. His funeral was held at his home on 559 Jefferson Avenue and he was buried at Elmwood Cemetery.
