= William James Whipper =

American lawyer, legislator, judge

South Carolina House of Representatives

Personal details
- Born: January 23, 1834 Norristown, Pennsylvania, U.S.
- Died: July 29, 1907 (aged 73) Beaufort, South Carolina, U.S.
- Spouse: Frances Rollin Whipper
- Children: Leigh Whipper, Ionia Rollin Whipper, 3 other children
- Relatives: William Whipper (uncle); Leighla Whipper (granddaughter)
- Known for: abolitionist, politician, lawyer, judge

Military service
- Allegiance: United States
- Branch/service: United States Army
- Years of service: 1864–1865
- Unit: 31st Colored Troops
- Battles/wars: Civil War

William James Whipper (January 23, 1834 – July 29, 1907) was an American abolitionist, trial lawyer, municipal judge, and state legislator in South Carolina. An African American, he volunteered for the United States Army during the American Civil War, serving from 1864 to November 1865 as a member of the 31st Colored Troops. He played an influential role in the state government of South Carolina during Reconstruction. As a delegate to the state's 1868 constitutional convention, he supported women's suffrage, although his motion to allow "every citizen" to vote was not taken seriously at the time. He was a noted political opponent of Robert Smalls as well as a dedicated trial lawyer.

== Early life ==
He was born in Norristown, Pennsylvania, on January 23, 1834. Whipper's uncle William Whipper was a noted abolitionist and he was named after him. He moved to Ohio, where he became a member of the abolition movement. He studied law in Detroit.

== Military service ==
Whipper volunteered for the United States Army during the Civil War, serving from 1864 to November 1865 as a member of the Colored Troops. During his military service he was court-martialed once for gambling and once for insulting a white lieutenant.

== Career ==
During his career as a trial lawyer, he once served as a co-counsel to Jonathan Jasper Wright, who later went on to become the first black judge of the Supreme Court of South Carolina.

Whipper was elected as a delegate to the state constitutional convention in 1868, where he gave a speech in support of allowing women to vote, but the delegates kept on interrupting him, and his speech was decided in negative. With Robert Elliott and Macon B. Allen, Whipper formed the nation's first known African-American law firm, Whipper, Elliott, and Allen.

He and John L. Mitchell represented barber George Brownfield, who was convicted of murder by an all-white jury in Georgetown, South Carolina.

He was sworn in as a member of the South Carolina House of Representatives in 1875.

== Family life ==
After the death of his first wife, Whipper married diarist Frances Anne Rollin in South Carolina. The couple had five children. Their daughter Ionia Rollin Whipper became a social reformer. As a result of marital discord, Frances separated from William during the early 1880s, taking her five children to Washington, D.C.

== Bibliography ==
- Holt, Thomas (1977). Black Over White: Negro Political Leadership in South Carolina During Reconstruction. University of Illinois Press. ISBN 9780252007750.
