= Morgan and Marvin Smith =

American twins and photographers

- Born: February 16, 1910; Nicholasville, Kentucky, U.S.
- Died: Morgan February 17, 1993 (aged 83) Marvin November 9, 2003 (aged 93)

Morgan (February 16, 1910 – February 17, 1993) and Marvin Smith, (February 16, 1910 – 2003) were identical African-American twin brothers. They were photographers and artists known for documenting the life of Harlem in the 1930s to 1950s.

== Biography ==
The brothers were born in Nicholasville, Kentucky to sharecroppers Charles and Allena Smith. The family moved to Lexington when Morgan and Marvin were 12 years old. They frequently helped their parents harvest crops and exercised their drawing skills from a young age by tracing pictures from Sears catalogs.

While in high school, Morgan and Marvin developed their artistic skills using oil paints and soaps to create sculptures. They worked numerous odd jobs while in high school which gained them connections with the wealthy, white population and allowed them to further their artistic ambitions. They acquired their first camera from an affluent local photographer and taught themselves how to use it. They were the first to graduate high school in their family and chose to pursue art careers despite receiving football scholarships to numerous Historically Black Colleges. The twins moved to New York City in 1933 due to lack of opportunity for Black artists in Kentucky. Before finding their place as photographers in Harlem, they worked for the Works Progress Administration building gardens and painting murals.

=== Marriage and family ===
Marvin and Morgan met twin sisters Anna and Florence McLean. Both couples were married on the same day in 1936 and both couples divorced in 1939. Morgan was remarried in 1950 to Monica Mais and had one daughter, Monica Smith Bolden. Marvin Smith never remarried.

== Early career ==
The Smiths decided to commit themselves to photography in 1937 and took free art classes taught by sculptor Augusta Savage. There, they met numerous other influential artists including Jacob Lawrence and Romare Bearden. Morgan became the first staff photographer for New York Amsterdam News in 1937, the most popular Black newspaper at the time. Two years later, they opened their own photography studio, M & M Smith Studios, next to the Apollo Theater on 125th Street. The twins were the theater's official photographers and met influential models, artists, and performers through this job. Their studio became a hub of activity for entertainers and writers, as well as the location of the majority of their portrait photography. They photographed George Washington Carver and Billie Holiday, among other famous Black artists and politicians, as well as street life in Harlem during this time.

The Smiths photographed with the intention of showing the different facets of Black life. Along with capturing the Civil rights movement and anti-lynching demonstrations, the brothers were among the first to capture the vibrant lives of Harlem residents.

== Late career ==
=== World War II ===
During World War II, the twins separated for the first time in their lives. Marvin served in the U.S. Navy while Morgan remained based in New York. Marvin was the first African American student to enroll at the Naval Air Station School of Photography and Motion Pictures while stationed in Pensacola, Florida. Morgan continued his work, photographing major news events and providing the pictures to a number of large Black newspapers throughout the country. He began working for a radical Harlem-based newspaper, The People's Voice in 1942, run by Adam Clayton Powell Jr. The paper received mixed reviews by the Harlem community for its criticism of the United States government. In addition to his work at the newspaper, Morgan was offered numerous opportunities to photograph for other larger publications, but refused.

=== Post-World War II ===
In the 1950s, the Smith's careers shifted from photography to film and television production, working as sound engineers and set decorators. Marvin studied with Romare Bearden and Fernand Léger in France after the end of World War II, while Morgan stayed in their New York studio. Morgan installed a sound studio and moved into recording popular orators and bands. He went on to work as a sound technician for ABC News. Marvin also worked in television until 1968 when they closed their studio, which had become a Harlem landmark. They retired from their television careers in 1975 at the age of 65.

The brothers, using New Media-technological advances and artistic talent, did video, sculpting, and painting at an extremely high level when resources were difficult to acquire for African Americans. Additionally, their mission was to shine their lens on all shades of Blackness during a time when dark skin was considered by some as a handicap in the entertainment industry.

== Documentary and resources ==
There have been several documentaries and books written about the brothers, including Harlem: The Vision of Morgan and Marvin Smith written by James and Morgan Smith on November 13, 1997.

They worked with the Schomburg Center for Research in Black Culture and a PBS Special aired in 1995.
