= Dr. Dio Lewis's School for Young Ladies =

School in Lexington, MA

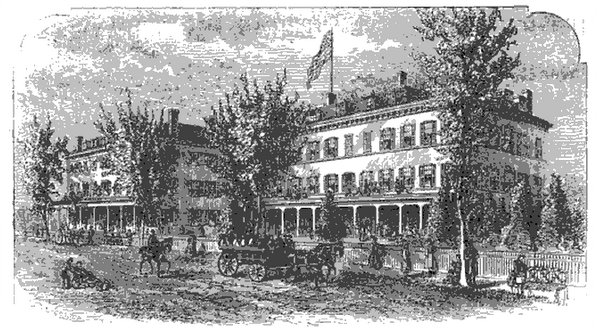
Dr. Dio Lewis's School for Young Ladies

Dr. Dio Lewis's School for Young Ladies was an American boarding school for young women. Founded in 1864 by Dr. Diocletian Lewis, it was located at the Lexington House, at Lexington, Massachusetts. The building was burned down on September 7, 1867. The school was the first academic institution for young ladies in the United States in which a determined and successful attempt was made to combine a thorough scientific physical training with a broad and complete intellectual and moral culture. Lewis' objective was to illustrate the possibilities in the physical development of girls during their school life.

Having engaged Theodore Dwight Weld, for many years Principal of the Eagleswood School, in New Jersey, and other experienced teachers, he opened his school with 20 pupils. A large corps of the best teachers in mathematics, sciences, languages, belle lettres, and music, to be found in the country, were engaged, and the opening announced. The school soon grew to 150 young women, gathered from all parts of the country, the Pacific Coast, Central America, and the West Indies. Girls who came unable to ascend a single flight of stairs without suffering, in a few months, were able to walk 5–10 miles (8.0–16.1 km) without inconvenience.

On September 7, 1867, when the house had been refitted the building took fire and was entirely consumed. The citizens of Lexington and the friends of physical education regarded it as a great calamity.

== Background ==
Lewis developed a system of gymnastics and he then moved to Boston, Massachusetts, to establish the Normal Institute for Physical Education, from which 270 students graduated. After several years Lewis determined to illustrate its possibilities in combining physical and intellectual culture in a young ladies’ seminary.

== History ==
The school began in the autumn of 1864. A large corps of experienced teachers, including Weld, formerly principal of the Eagleswood institution at New Jersey, was engaged. During the first year, the pupils numbered 30; during the second year, about 100; and during the third year, 144.

The pupils came from California, Missouri and Iowa. Girls of delicate constitutions were sent to the Institution, and they became healthier and strong. Beginning very cautiously with the practice of the mildest forms of muscular movement a few minutes each day, they soon were able to practice two or three hours a day in vigorous gymnastic exercises. Many young ladies came with the condition that they were not to go up stairs, for they were not able to ascend a flight of stairs. Almost without exception, within a few months, those most delicate girls found themselves able to practice the more active gymnastic exercises for more than two hours a day, and on occasions walked 5–10 miles (8.0–16.1 km). Careful measurements of the size of the chest under the arms, of the waist, shoulders, and arms, were made when the pupils entered the school. It was found that the average gain in a single year's training was about 2.5 inches (64 mm) in the chest, and much in the same proportion about the waist, arms, and shoulders. All learned to walk with grace and dignity. The progress of the pupils in all the intellectual departments of the school, which were as broad and complete as in any institution in the U.S., was singularly rapid.

The building was burned down on September 7, 1867. During that year, the school was carried on in a small way in another building near the site of that which was burned. The loss sustained by Lewis was very large, requiring US$100,000 to rebuild and furnish it. As he found it impossible to raise the necessary funds, he closed the school at the end of that year.

== Architecture and fittings ==
Seeking in New England suitable buildings, Lewis found them in the Lexington House, in Lexington, 10 miles (16 km) from Boston, and 200 feet (61 m) above sea level, this location being free from the fogs of the New England coast. In the spring of 1864, Lewis purchased the Lexington House, which was erected for a hotel, and fitted it up for a school for young ladies at large expense. The buildings, accommodating 200 persons, were located on the first battlefield of the American Revolutionary War.

== Notable students ==
- Harriet Abbott Lincoln Coolidge, author, philanthropist, reformer
- Lillie Buffum Chace Wyman, author and social reformer
