= The Liberator (newspaper) =

American abolitionist newspaper (1831–1865)

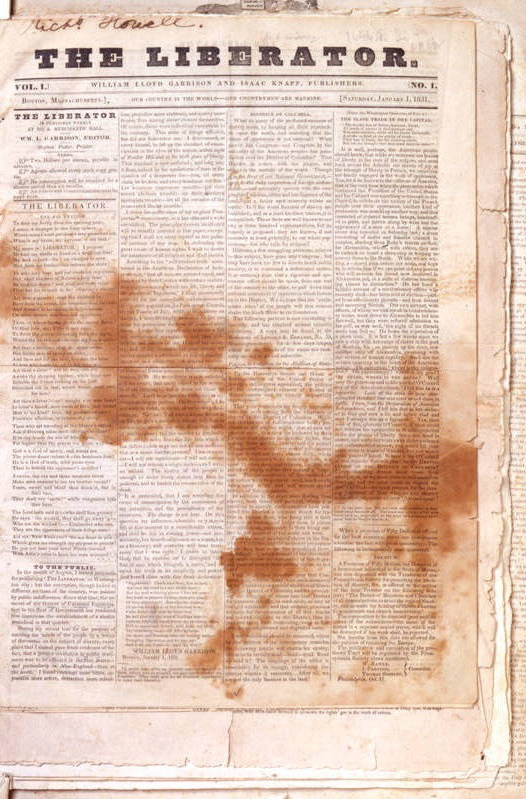
- Liberator v.1, No.1, 1831
- Type: Weekly newspaper
- Publisher: William Lloyd Garrison and Isaac Knapp
- Founded: January 1, 1831; 195 years ago
- Ceased publication: December 29, 1865
- Political alignment: Abolitionism; Feminism
- City: Boston, Massachusetts
- Country: United States
- OCLC number: 1728160

The Liberator (1831–1865) was a weekly abolitionist newspaper, printed and published in Boston by William Lloyd Garrison and, through 1839, by Isaac Knapp. Religious rather than political, it appealed to the moral conscience of its readers, urging them to demand immediate freeing of the slaves ("immediatism"). It also promoted women's rights, an issue that split the American abolitionist movement. Despite its modest circulation of 3,000, it had prominent and influential readers, including all the abolitionist leaders, among them Frederick Douglass, Beriah Green, Arthur and Lewis Tappan, and Alfred Niger. It frequently printed or reprinted letters, reports, sermons, and news stories relating to American slavery, becoming a sort of community bulletin board for the new abolitionist movement that Garrison helped foster.

== History ==
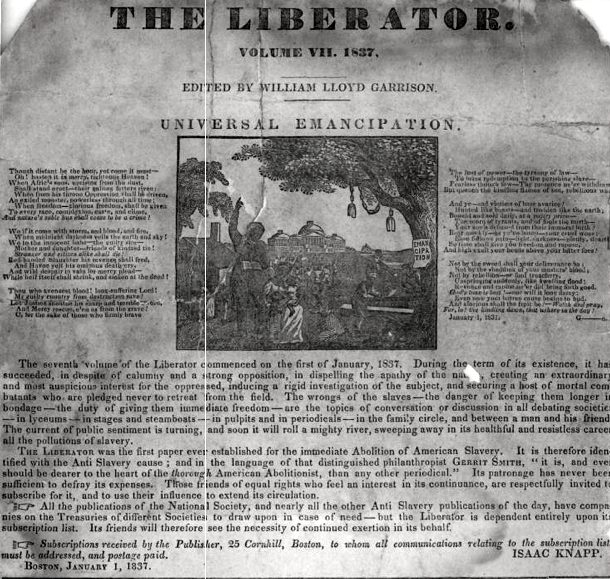
An issue of The Liberator depicting African Americans next to a lynching tree

Garrison co-published weekly issues of The Liberator from Boston continuously for 35 years, from January 1, 1831, to the final issue of December 29, 1865.

First published on Congress Street, the offices moved to a variety of locations on Washington Street and Cornhill (25 Cornhill).

Although its circulation was only about 3,000, and three-quarters of subscribers (in 1834) were African Americans, the newspaper earned nationwide notoriety for its uncompromising advocacy of "immediate and complete emancipation of all slaves" in the United States. Garrison set the tone for the paper in his famous open letter "To the Public" in the first issue:

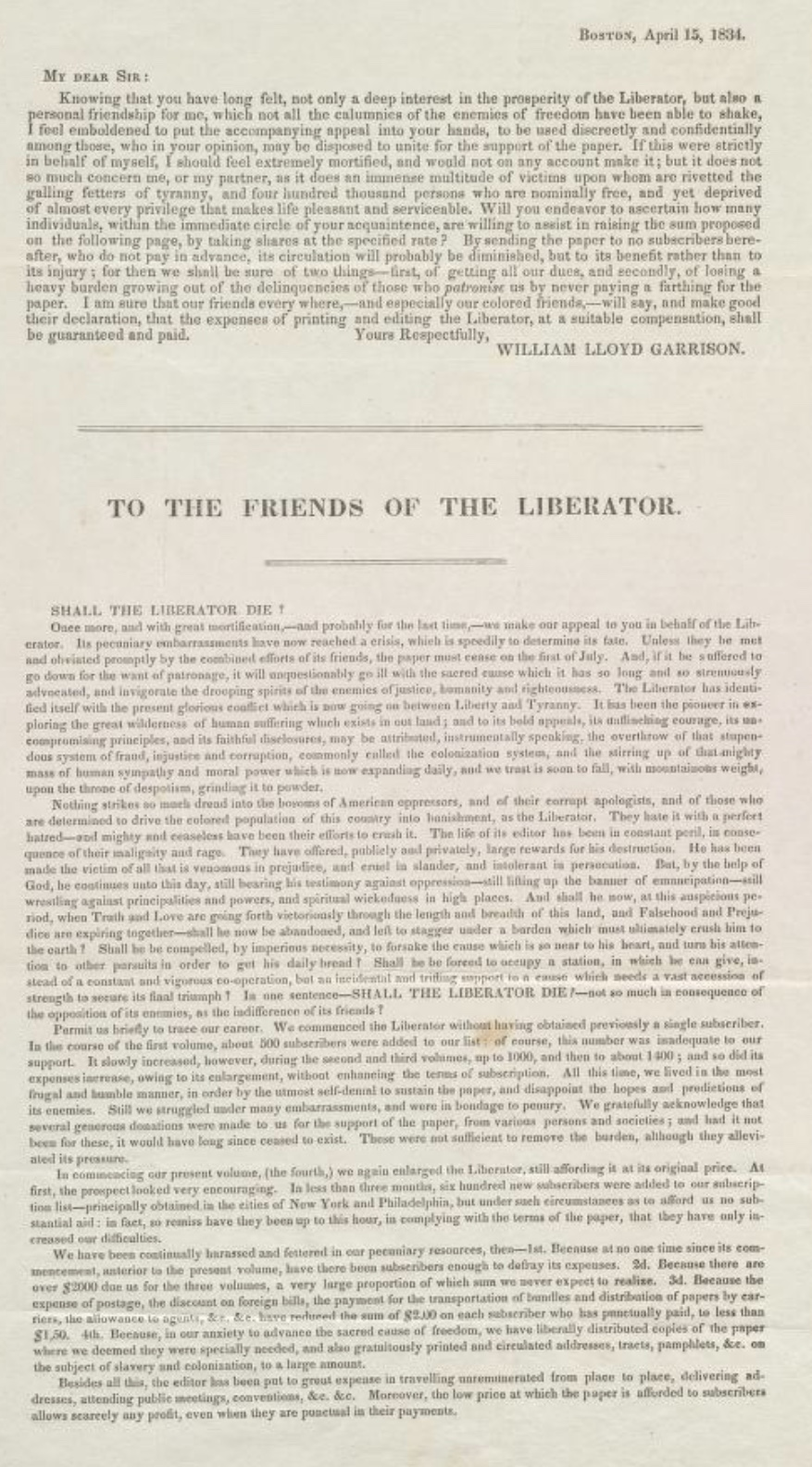
Fundraising appeal of William Garrison, 1834

... Assenting to the "self-evident truth" maintained in the American Declaration of Independence, "that all men are created equal, and endowed by their Creator with certain inalienable rights—among which are life, liberty and the pursuit of happiness," I shall strenuously contend for the immediate enfranchisement of our slave population. In Park-street Church, on the Fourth of July, 1829, in an address on slavery, I unreflectingly assented to the popular but pernicious doctrine of gradual abolition. I seize this opportunity to make a full and unequivocal recantation, and thus publicly to ask pardon of my God, of my country, and of my brethren the poor slaves, for having uttered a sentiment so full of timidity, injustice and absurdity. A similar recantation, from my pen, was published in the Genius of Universal Emancipation at Baltimore, in September, 1829. My conscience is now satisfied. I am aware, that many object to the severity of my language; but is there not cause for severity? I will be as harsh as truth, and as uncompromising as justice. On this subject, I do not wish to think, or speak, or write, with moderation. No! no! Tell a man whose house is on fire, to give a moderate alarm; tell him to moderately rescue his wife from the hand of the ravisher; tell the mother to gradually extricate her babe from the fire into which it has fallen;—but urge me not to use moderation in a cause like the present. I am in earnest—I will not equivocate—I will not excuse—I will not retreat a single inch—AND I WILL BE HEARD. ...

Rather than looking to politics to create change, Garrison utilized nonviolent means, such as moral suasion, as his message throughout the newspaper. Garrison felt that slavery was a moral issue and used his way of writing to appeal to the morality of his readers as an attempt to influence them into changing their morally questionable ways. For example, "No Union with Slave-Holders" was a slogan utilized for weeks at a time throughout the newspaper's publication, advocating that the North should leave the Union.

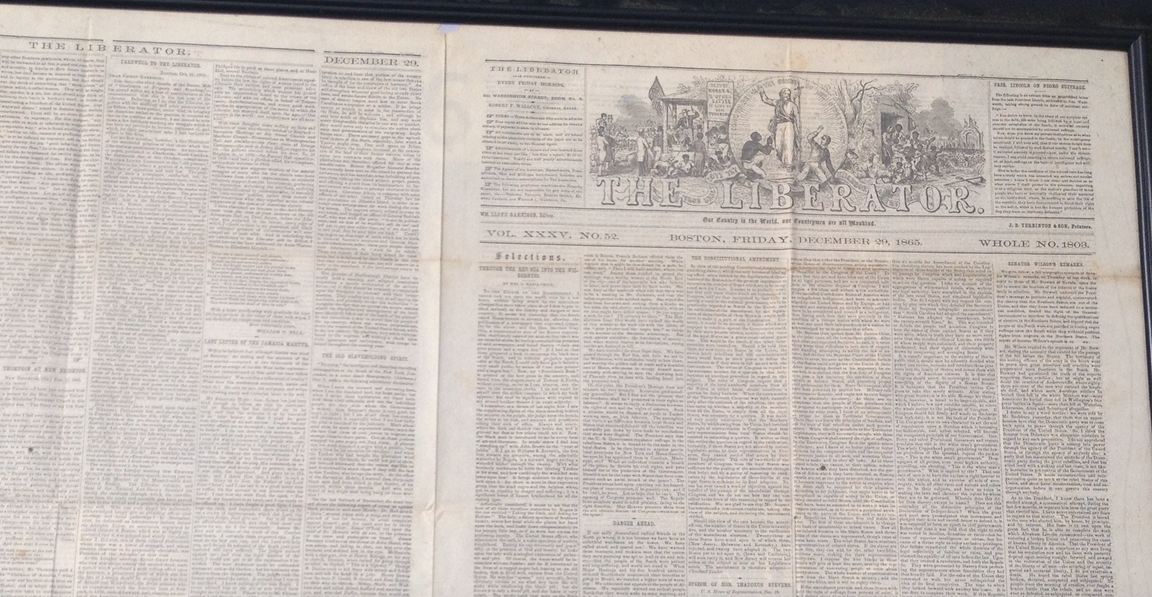
Garrison celebrates 13th amendment.

The Liberator continued for three decades from its founding through the end of the American Civil War. It had black columnists and reporters. Garrison ended the newspaper's run with a valedictory column at the end of 1865, when the ratification of the Thirteenth Amendment abolished slavery throughout the United States. It was succeeded by The Nation.

== Women's rights advocacy ==
Between January 7, 1832 and May 4, 1833, the Liberator published six articles by Maria W. Stewart, an abolitionist and one of the first American women to lecture before mixed-race and mixed-gender audiences.

The Liberator also became an avowed women's rights newspaper when the prospectus for its 1838 issue declared that as the paper's objective was "to redeem woman as well as man from a servile to an equal condition," it would support "the rights of woman to their utmost extent." In January and February 1838, the Liberator published Sarah Grimké's "Letters on the Province of Woman", and later that year published them as a book, to another of Garrison and Knapp's projects Boston Female Anti-Slavery Society. During the following decades, the Liberator promoted women's rights by publishing editorials, petitions, convention calls and proceedings, speeches, legislative action, and other material advocating women's suffrage, equal property rights, and women's educational and professional equality. The Liberator's printers, Isaac Knapp, James Brown Yerrinton (1800–1866) and James Manning Winchell Yerrinton (1825–1893), and Robert Folger Wallcut (1797–1884), printed many of the women's rights tracts of the 1850s.

== Inspiration among abolitionists ==
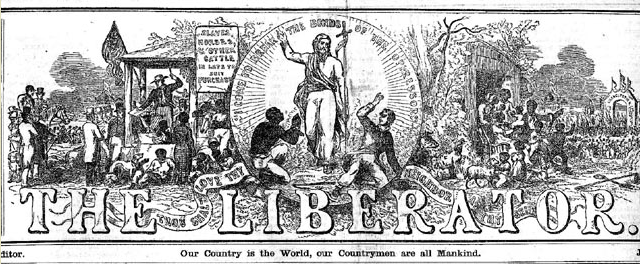
1850 Liberator masthead, designed by Hammatt Billings

The Liberator inspired abolitionist Angelina Grimké to publicly join the abolitionist movement. She sent a letter to William Lloyd Garrison recalling her experiences as a member of an upper class, white, slaveholding family. Angelina Grimké's letter to William Lloyd Garrison was soon after published in The Liberator.

Frederick Douglass was at first inspired by The Liberator. As he commented upon in his first issue of The North Star, Douglass felt that it was necessary for African Americans, such as himself, to speak out about their own experiences with injustice. He claimed that those that experienced injustice were the ones that must demand justice. Soon after, Douglass began writing his own abolitionist newspaper, The North Star. By 1851 Douglass broke bitterly with Garrison and now worked for abolition and equality through the U.S. Constitution and political system.

in 1836, five years after he agreed to be The Liberator's agent in Rhode Island, Alfred Niger helped to found the Rhode Island Anti-Slavery Society, one of only two Black men in the entire organization.

== Resistance ==
What changed The Liberator from a small abolitionist organ to a national one was the attention paid to it in the South. Southern papers reprinted and editorialized its articles and announcements, thus bringing them further to the attention of Northern readers and editors.

The Liberator faced harsh resistance from several state legislatures and local groups: for example, North Carolina indicted Garrison for felonious acts, and the Vigilance Association of Columbia, South Carolina, offered a reward of $1,500 (equivalent to $48,375 in 2025) to those who identified distributors of the paper.

Garrison also faced resistance, even to the point of violence. In 1835, a Boston mob formed with support from local newspapers in resistance to the announcement that George Thompson would speak at the first anniversary meeting of the Boston Female Anti-Slavery Society. The mob, unable to find Thompson, redirected their aggression towards Garrison who was in the society's meeting hall. Eventually escalation of the situation led to destruction of the society's antislavery sign, and even calls to lynch Garrison, around whose neck a piece of rope made into a noose was put. Garrison eventually managed a narrow escape; the mayor put him in the city jail for his protection.

== Contents online ==
- The Liberator full online archives at Fair Use Repository, including archives of full-page scans of all issues from 1831–1865 (Vols. I–XXXV).
- The Liberator Complete Archives at the Digital Commonwealth of Massachusetts. Original copy owned by Garrison and served as the copy of reference at The Liberator offices.
- The Liberator Files searchable (basic search only) collection maintained by Horace Seldon, which says on its home page that it contains "only a tiny portion of what appeared in the 1,803 editions of the paper".

=== Garrison's articles ===
Garrison wrote much of the content. He wrote while typesetting; that is to say, most was not written out on paper first. The following are examples of articles and editorials written by him:

- To the Public, Garrison's introductory column, January 1, 1831.
- Truisms, January 8, 1831.
- Walker's Appeal, January 8, 1831.
- The Insurrection, Garrison's reaction to the news of Nat Turner's slave rebellion in Virginia, September 3, 1831.
- The Great Crisis!, December 29, 1832, one of Garrison's first explicit condemnations of the Constitution and the Union.
- Declaration of Sentiments, adopted by the Boston Peace Convention September 18, 1838, reprinted in The Liberator, September 28, 1838.
- Abolition at the Ballot Box, June 28, 1839.
- The American Union, January 10, 1845.
- American Colorphobia, June 11, 1847.
- On the Dissolution of the Union, June 15, 1855.
- The Tragedy at Harper's Ferry, Garrison's first public comments on John Brown's raid on Harpers Ferry, October 28, 1859.
- John Brown and the Principle of Nonresistance, a speech given at a meeting in the Tremont Temple, Boston, on December 2, 1859, the day that John Brown was hanged, printed December 16, 1859.
- The War – Its Cause and Cure, May 3, 1861.
- Valedictory: The Final Number of The Liberator, Garrison's closing column, December 29, 1865.

== See also ==
- Abolitionist publications
- North Star, an anti-slavery newspaper owned and run by Frederick Douglass.
- Women's suffrage publications
- List of newspapers in Massachusetts

== Bibliography ==
- Fanuzzi, Robert A. " 'The Organ of an Individual': William Lloyd Garrison and the Liberator." Prospects 23 (1998): 107-127.
- Jacobs, Donald M. "William Lloyd Garrison's Liberator and Boston's Blacks, 1830-1865." New England Quarterly (1971): 259-277. online
- Nord, David Paul. "Tocqueville, Garrison and the perfection of journalism." Journalism History 13.2 (1986): 56-63. online
- Rohrbach, Augusta. " 'Truth Stranger and Stronger than Fiction': Reexamining William Lloyd Garrison’s The Liberator." in Truth Stranger Than Fiction: Race, Realism, and the US Literary Market Place (Palgrave Macmillan US, 2002) pp. 1–27.
- Streitmatter, Rodger (2001). Voices of Revolution. New York: Columbia University Press. pp. 21–35. ISBN 0231122497.
- Williams, Cecil B. "Whittier's Relation to Garrison and the 'Liberator'." New England Quarterly (1952): 248-255. online

=== Primary sources ===
- Cain, William E. ed. William Lloyd Garrison and the Fight Against Slavery: Selections from The Liberator (Bedford Books of St. Martin’s Press, 1992)
- Garrison, William Lloyd. Documents of Upheaval: Selections from William Lloyd Garrison's The Liberator, 1831-1965 (Hill and Wang, 1966).
