= Lionel Belasco =

Trinidadian-Venezuelan recording artist

Lionel Belasco (Maracaibo (Venezuela) 20 September 1881 – c. 24 June 1967), also known as Lionel "Lanky" Belasco, was a pianist, arranger, composer, promoter and bandleader from Trinidad and Tobago. Belasco was a pianist, composer and bandleader best known for his Calypso recordings.

== Biography ==
According to various sources, Belasco was born in Maracaibo (Venezuela), the son of an Afro-Caribbean mother and a Sephardic Jewish father. He spent his early childhood in Port of Spain, Trinidad and Tobago, and grew up in Trinidad. He traveled widely in the Caribbean and South America in his youth, absorbing a wide variety of musical influences. As well as working as a musician performing for the elite, Belasco worked in the function of manager and promoter at London Electric Theater in Port of Spain, Trinidad. The London Electric Theater was the first movie theatre in the capital city of Trinidad. He was leading his own band by 1902, and made his first phonograph recordings in Trinidad in 1914.

Belasco played with a band called the Carib Singers and led the band Belasco's Renowned String Band. Recorded songs include a folk Calypso tune titled, "Wash-Pan-Wash", which was identified under the genre "Paseo". Belasco recorded the Spanish Waltz "Lucille" around 1935.

Belasco claimed that "Rum and Coca-Cola", a big hit in the 1940s, was based on a calypso called "L'Année Passée" that he had published in a song folio in 1943. "L'Année" in turn was actually based on a Martinquean folk song, although Belasco claimed to have written it in the early 1900s.
