= Frances Rollin Whipper =

American political activist (1845–1901)

- Born: 19 November 1845; Charleston
- Died: 17 October 1901 (aged 55); Beaufort
- Occupation: Writer, suffragist
- Spouse(s): William James Whipper
- Children: Ionia Rollin Whipper, Leigh Whipper

Frances Anne Rollin Whipper (November 19, 1845 – October 17, 1901) was a political activist, teacher, and author. Whipper and her four sisters were socially and politically active within the South Carolina state government during the Reconstruction era. In 1867, she won one of the earliest Civil Rights lawsuits for being denied first class passage on a steamship traveling between Beaufort and Charleston, South Carolina. Whipper wrote and published the biography of the abolitionist, nationalist, and highest ranking Black commissioned officer in the Union army, Martin R. Delany (1812-1885). Published under the name Frank A. Rollin in 1868, The Life and Public Services of Martin R. Delany, was the first full-length biography written by an African American. Whipper's 1868 diary, one of the earliest known diaries by a southern Black woman, details her social and intellectual activities in Boston, as well as her courtship and early months of marriage to William James Whipper, a member of the South Carolina legislature and proponent of women's suffrage.

== Early life, family and education ==
Francis Rollin Whipper was born on November 19, 1845, in Charleston, South Carolina to William and Margarette Rollin, free persons of color. Little is known about the background of Rollin's wife Margarette; she is presumed to be of French Caribbean descent. William Rollin (1815–1880) was a biracial descendant of the De Caradeuc family, which had left Saint Domingue in 1792 to escape the insurrection of enslaved people against the French colonial government. The De Caradeuc family settled near Charleston and became involved in the lumber trade. Rollin's parents are unidentified, but he had a fair complexion and could pass as a white person. He became a successful lumber merchant in Charleston with extensive trading connections. Rollin owned a number of properties in Charleston and kept three enslaved workers.

The Rollin family was part of Charleston's antebellum "colored aristocracy," a small, close community of families that enjoyed the privileges of wealth, property, and education, despite laws prohibiting the education of persons of African descent. This elite community created their own social and cultural organizations and followed a code of strict decorum and etiquette.

Frances was the oldest of five daughters born to William and Margarette. Her younger sisters were Charlotte (1847–1928), Katherine (1851–76), Louisa (born 1858), and Florence (born 1861). Rollin was a devout Catholic and ensured that his daughters received an excellent education through private tutors and parish schools. In 1859, Frances went to live with family friends in Philadelphia and enrolled in the Institute for Colored Youth. Enriched by the political and intellectual opportunities she encountered in Philadelphia, Rollin began her career as a writer and activist for civil rights and women's suffrage.

Charlotte, Katherine, and Louisa were also sent to school in Philadelphia and Boston in advance of the Civil War. All of the Rollin sisters, with the exception of the very young Florence, remained in the north until the end of the war.

== Reconstruction Era activities (1865–1877) ==
Frances Rollin was twenty-years old when she returned to her hometown of Charleston in 1865. The war had severely impacted her father's business and wealth. Rollin became a teacher at a school sponsored by the Freedmen's Bureau, a U.S. government agency that aided distressed freed slaves during the Reconstruction era. Rollin later taught at a school sponsored by the American Missionary Association. In 1867, after being denied first-class passage on the steamer Pilot Boy between Beaufort and Charleston, South Carolina, Rollin sued W.T. McNelty, the captain of the steamer. The case was brought to court and the captain was found guilty of discrimination and fined $250. She was assisted in her lawsuit by Major Martin R. Delany who worked for the Freedman's Bureau. Learning of her literary aspirations, Delany commissioned Rollin to write his biography. In the fall of 1867, Rollin decided to go to Boston to write the biography and find a publisher. She stayed in Boston for eight months, during which she actively participated in the intellectual life of city. Rollin became acquainted with William Lloyd Garrison, Wendell Phillips, and other white anti-slavery leaders in Boston. She completed the manuscript and published Life and Public Services of Martin R. Delany in early summer of 1868.

Rollin returned to South Carolina at the end of July to take a job in the law offices of William James Whipper. Whipper had moved to Columbia after the war and just won election to the state legislature shortly before employing Rollin. After a brief courtship, Rollin agreed to married Whipper, despite concerns from her family. The couple married on September 17 1868. Rollin became deeply involved in her husband career. She edited the Beaufort Tribune, the newspaper directed at his constituents and wrote articles for other newspapers. Generally known as his most trusted advisor and confidante, the duo became known around town as "the Whippers."

Rollin also supported her politically active sisters. Katherine and Charlotte Rollin, had moved to the state capital of Columbia in 1867 where they eventually secured jobs working in state government. Known for their intelligence and charm, their home in Columbia became a gathering place for the social and political elite including Republican Party leaders and their wives. Frances' husband William J. Whipper was a significant ally in their efforts to secure women's rights and suffrage. He was the only representative to endorse women's suffrage at the state constitutional convention in 1868. Charlotte spoke in public and before the state House of Representative in favor of suffrage. She and Katherine organized a women's rights convention that was held in Columbia in 1870. The following year, Charlotte presided over the first meeting of the South Carolina Branch of the American Woman Suffrage Association in the Whipper's home.

== Writing Life and Public Services of Martin R. Delany ==
In 1867, Rollin was assisted in her lawsuit against W.T. McNelty, the captain of the ferry Pilot Boy by Major Martin R. Delany. Delany was impressed with her abilities as a writer and eventually asked Rollin to write his biography. In the fall of 1867, Rollin went to Boston to write the biography and find a publisher. She stayed in Boston for eight months, during which she actively participated in the intellectual life of city. Rollin attended lectures Ralph Waldo Emerson and a reading by Charles Dickens. She spent her Sundays visiting different churches to listen to the sermons and had an active social life. Rollin became acquainted with William Lloyd Garrison, Wendell Phillips, and other white anti-slavery leaders in Boston. Her writing progressed steadily, despite the need to take up sewing or copying to earn income. By July 1868, she had published Life and Public Services of Martin R. Delany with the Boston publishing company Lee and Shepard. Rollin published the book under the pen name Frank A. Rollin. This book became the first full-length biography written by an African American.

== Diary ==
Frances Ann Rollin kept a detailed diary during 1868. The diary is now in the collection of the Smithsonian National Museum of African American History and Culture. Rollin's diary "describes her writing experiences as well as her meetings with notable abolitionists and luminaries of the Civil War era and notes Delany's financial challenges once the Civil War ended." Her diary became the earliest known diary by a southern black woman. Her diary "allowed a rare glimpse into the social life of Columbia, the South Carolina capital, and recorded the anti-black, anti-Republican violence then ongoing in the state during Reconstruction."

== Marriage and family ==
At the end of July in 1868, Rollin returned from Boston to South Carolina to take a job in the law offices of William James Whipper. Whipper had moved to Columbia after the war and just won election to the state legislature shortly before employing Rollin. After a brief courtship, Rollin agreed to married Whipper, despite concerns from her family. The couple married on September 17, 1868. Rollin became deeply involved in her husband career. She edited the Beaufort Tribune, the newspaper directed at his constituents and wrote articles for other newspapers. Generally known as his most trusted advisor and confidante, the duo became known around town as "the Whippers."

Rollin gave birth to five children, three of which survived to adulthood: Alicia (1869–1869), Winifred (1870–1907), Ionia (1872–1953), Mary Elizabeth (1874–1875), and their son Leigh (1876–1975). Whipper had two children from his first marriage to Mary Elizabeth Whipper (died 1867), and an adopted son, Demps Whipper Powell.

While married, Frances Rollin, now Frances Whipper, began writing diaries which focused on the social life of Columbia, South Carolina and recorded the anti-black, anti-Republican violence that was on-going in the state.

After 12 years, the Whippers' marriage began to decline due to marital and political issues. In 1880, Rollin took their three children to Washington DC and became a clerk in the General Land Office, and later in the office of Frederick Douglass, who was then the recorder of deeds for the District of Columbia. Whipper joined them in 1882 and practiced law for two years before returning to take up politics again in South Carolina. Rollin's children graduated from Washington D.C. public schools and attended Howard University. Winifred Whipper became a teacher and nurse. After teaching in Washington DC public schools for ten years, Ionia Rollin Whipper attended and graduated from Howard University College of Medicine, where she "became one of the first black women physicians in the United States." Leigh Whipper enjoyed a long and successful career as a stage and film actor.

== Later life ==
In addition to working and assisting her children with their educations, Rollin continued to write and was involved in politics while living in Washington DC. In 1892 "she contracted an illness while campaigning for Republican Presidential Candidate James G. Blaine. Whipper reconciled with her husband and returned to South Carolina sometime after 1893. She died of tuberculosis on October 17, 1901 in Beaufort, South Carolina.
