= Mossell =

Mossell is a surname and a given name. Notable people with the name include:

Given name:

- Sadie Mossell Alexander (1898–1989), pioneering black professional and civil rights activist
- Mary Mossell Griffin (1882–1968), American writer, clubwoman and suffragist

Surname:

- Aaron Albert Mossell (1863–1951), African-American lawyer
- Gertrude Bustill Mossell (1855–1948), American journalist, author, teacher and activist
- Mary Ella Mossell (1853–1886), American African Methodist Episcopal missionary in Haiti
- Nathan Francis Mossell (1856–1946), African-American physician
