= Dorothy Pelham Beckley =

American educator

- Born: Gabrielle Dorothy Pelham; May 1897; Detroit, Michigan
- Died: August 16, 1959 (aged 62)
- Occupation: Educator
- Known for: 2nd national president, Delta Sigma Theta (1923–1926)
- Relatives: Benjamin Pelham (uncle); Frederick B. Pelham (uncle); Meta E. Pelham (aunt); Sara Pelham Speaks (sister)

Dorothy Pelham Beckley (May 1897 – August 16, 1959) was an American educator and clubwoman. She was the second national president of the Delta Sigma Theta sorority, in office from 1923 to 1926.

== Early life and education ==
Gabrielle Dorothy Pelham was born in Detroit, Michigan and raised in Washington, D.C., the daughter of Robert Pelham Jr. and Gabrielle Lewis Pelham. Her father was a lawyer, inventor, and newspaper editor who worked for the U.S. Census Bureau; her mother was a pianist and organist from Ohio, who taught music in Washington, and was one of the founders of the Detroit Study Club. Her sister Sara Pelham Speaks was a lawyer and activist. Their uncles included Benjamin Pelham, who worked with Robert as an editor and owner of the Detroit Plaindealer, and Frederick B. Pelham, the first Black engineering graduate from the University of Michigan. Their aunt Meta Pelham was a journalist who wrote for the Plaindealer.

While she was at Howard University during World War I, she was active in the school's Red Cross unit.

== Career ==
Pelham was a founding member of the Washington, D.C. alumnae chapter of Delta Sigma Theta in 1921. From 1923 to 1926 she was national president of the sorority. She spoke on a panel about "The Part of the Young College-Bred Negro in Race Betterment" at a national conference held at Howard University in 1924. In 1925, she became a member of the executive board of the National Association of College Women. In 1927, she refused re-election to a third term as president of Delta Sigma Theta, and she gave a radio address from the sorority's national meeting in Cincinnati, Ohio. Also in 1927, she made an unsuccessful legal protest against being transferred from one school to another.

In 1939, as a member of the Interracial Committee of the District of Columbia, Beckley testified about school funding before a Senate committee hearing on appropriations. During World War II, she was salvage chair of the Howard Park Defense Area, and organized a scrap metal drive called "Give-a-Gun Week" in 1942. She also organized a book drive in the segregated schools, to send reading material to servicemen overseas. After the war, she was active in fundraising for the Ionia A. Whipper Home.

== Personal life ==
Pelham married physician Edgar R. Beckley Jr. in 1926. They had three sons. Her husband died in 1949, and she died in 1959.
