= Bustill =

Bustill is a surname. Notable people with the surname include:

- The Bustill family, whose notable members were:
  - Cyrus Bustill (1732–1806) African American abolitionist, baker and founding member of the Free African Society
  - Charles Hicks Bustill (1816–1890), American, plasterer, abolitionist and conductor in the Underground Railroad
  - Joseph Cassey Bustill (1822–1895), African American conductor in the Underground Railroad
  - Maria Louisa Bustill (1853–1904), American, Quaker schoolteacher
