= List of African American newspapers in Indiana =

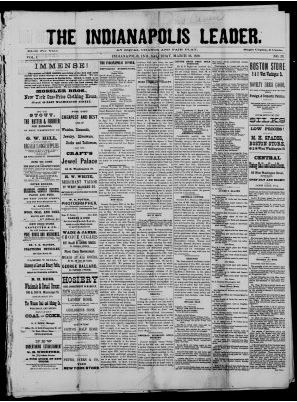
Front page of the Indianapolis Leader, one of Indiana's first African American newspapers.

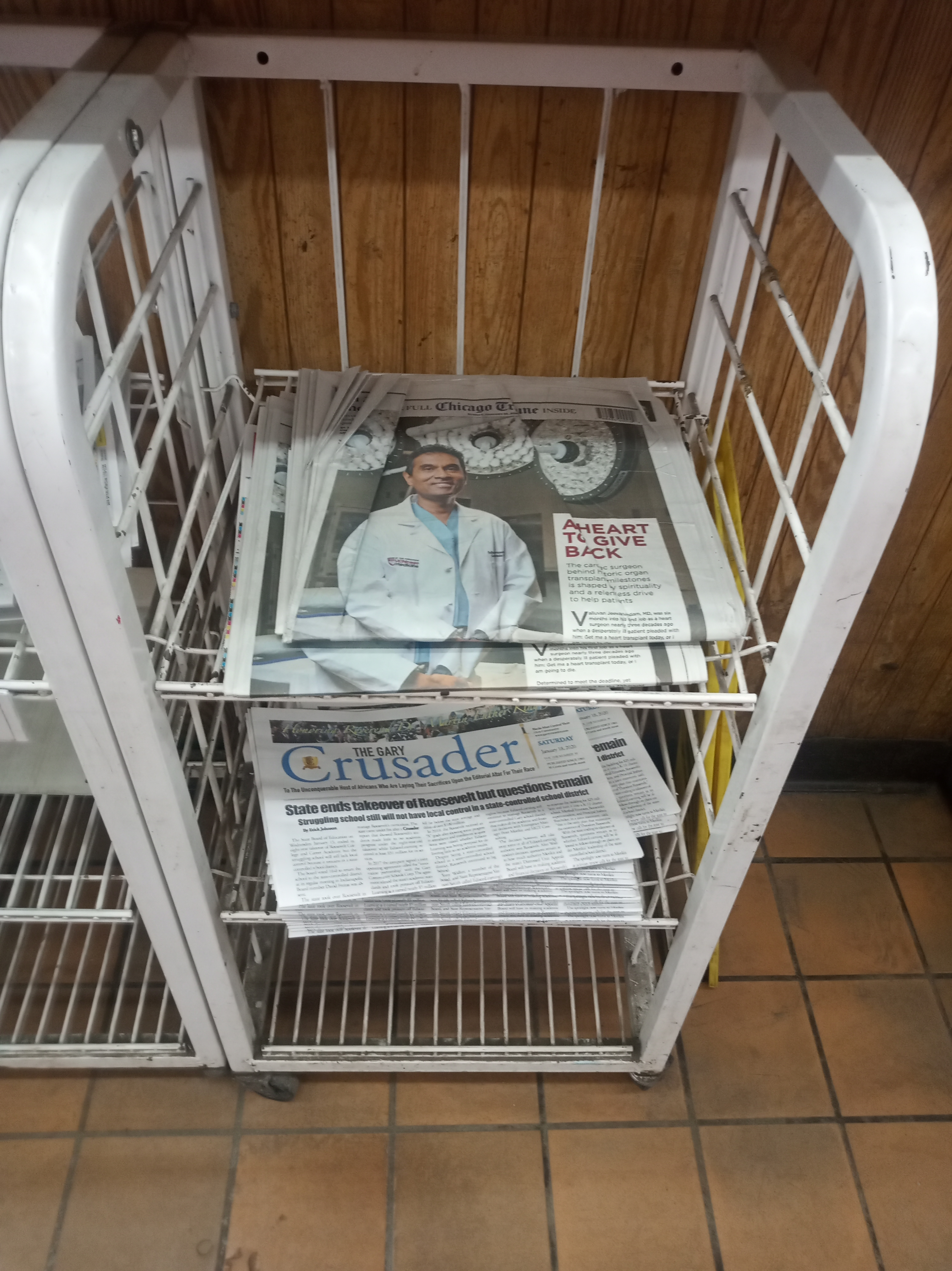
Newspaper rack with issues of the Gary Crusader in 2020.

Various African American newspapers have been published in Indiana. The Evansville weekly Our Age, which was in circulation by 1878, is the first known African American newspaper in Indiana. Alternatively, some sources assign the title of first to the Indianapolis Leader or the Logansport Colored Visitor, both of which were first published in August 1879.

A 1996 survey of Indiana's African American newspapers found that two-thirds were founded before the Great Migration began in 1915. Only a quarter of the newspapers surveyed lasted for more than five years. Despite the high rate of attrition, African American newspapers continued to be established in Indiana throughout the 20th century and into the 21st.

More than half the African American newspapers in Indiana have been published in Indianapolis and Evansville. In the northern part of the state, the greatest number of such newspapers have been published in Gary.

The following list contains some newspapers published only on an irregular or sporadic basis, or for which no information on frequency is available. Many of these shorter-lived newspapers, particularly in the 19th century, were political broadsheets produced only in connection with a specific election.

African American newspapers published in Indiana today include the Gary Crusader, the Indianapolis Recorder, the Fort Wayne Ink Spot, and Evansville's Our Times Newspaper.

== Northern Indiana ==
Northern Indiana is the northern third of the state, home to the industrial Calumet Region as well as small cities further east such as South Bend, Fort Wayne and Logansport.

| City | Title | Beginning | End | Frequency | Call numbers | Remarks |
|---|---|---|---|---|---|---|
| East Chicago | The Forum | 1950 | ? | Weekly | | |
| East Chicago | East Chicago Voice; Citizen Voice | 1962 | 1970s | Weekly | | Edited by Thorton Smith. |
| Elkhart | Spirit Publications | 1975 | ? | Weekly | LCCN sn87056390; OCLC 16835457 | Attested through at least 1976. |
| Fort Wayne | Coffee Break | 1960s | 1960s | Weekly | LCCN sn87056700; OCLC 16886111 | Published by Joe H. Andrews. Extant issues date from 1968 and 1969. |
| Fort Wayne | Frost Illustrated | 1968 | 2017 | Weekly | LCCN sn87055965; OCLC 15626550 | |
| Fort Wayne | Ink | 2001 | 2009 | Weekly | | |
| Fort Wayne | Fort Wayne Ink Spot | 2018 | current | Biweekly | | Official site |
| Fort Wayne | The Fort Wayne Observer | 1900s | 1900s | Weekly | LCCN sn90068952; OCLC 22481729 | Attested from 1955. |
| Gary | Gary American; The Gary Colored American (1927–1928) | 1927 | ? | Weekly, later biweekly | LCCN sn86058053; OCLC 13231213; Gary Colored American: LCCN sn86058052; OCLC 13231111 | |
| Gary | The Commonwealth | 1924 | 1934 | Weekly | LCCN sn87055673; OCLC 15117675 | |
| Gary | The Gary Crusader | 1961 | current | Weekly | LCCN sn83025624; OCLC 18766769, 2400666, 9694324; ISSN 1930-7012 | Official site; Published by Dorothy Leavell. |
| Gary | Gary Dispatch, later Lake County Journal | 1921 | 1924 | Weekly or irregular | | |
| Gary | Gary Info | 1963 | ? | Weekly | LCCN sn87055756, sn94085049; OCLC 15504502, 32260852 | Published by Imogene Harris. |
| Gary | Lake County Observer | 1946 | 1950 | Irregular | | |
| Gary | Gary Sun; National Defender And Sun | 1905 | 1931 or 1929 | Weekly | LCCN sn83025598, sn87056403, sn87056497, sn87056498; OCLC 16626132, 16626135, 16626142, 9647337 | Moved to Gary from Milwaukee in 1910s, became a national women's magazine around 1923 |
| Logansport | The Colored Visitor | 1879 | 1879 | Twice monthly or irregular | LCCN 2011254353, sn82016213; OCLC 2639492, 747720174, 9202276 | |
| Marion | Community Express | 1980 | 1981 (uncertain) | Weekly | LCCN sn87055065; OCLC 15080420 | Published by James Carter. |
| South Bend | South Bend Forum | 1923 | 1900s | Weekly | LCCN 2014254043; OCLC 879304902 | |
| South Bend | South Bend Herald-Times | 1950s | 1900s | | LCCN sn95063990; OCLC 32881294 | |
| South Bend | South Bend Journal | 1928 | ? | Weekly | | Edited by William D. LaMarr. |
| South Bend | The Reformer | 1967 | 1971 | Weekly | | Free online archive |
| South Bend | Observer | 1913 | | | | |

== Central Indiana ==
Central Indiana takes up the central third of the state, including the state capital Indianapolis as well as numerous small cities including Anderson, Muncie and Terre Haute.

| City | Title | Beginning | End | Frequency | Call numbers | Remarks |
|---|---|---|---|---|---|---|
| Anderson | The Shining Star | 1922 | 1927 (uncertain) | Weekly or irregular | LCCN sn86058388; OCLC 13317294 | |
| Indianapolis | The Anthem | 1991 | ? | Weekly | | |
| Indianapolis | Argus | 1886 | 1887 | | | |
| Indianapolis | Black Focus Newsweekly | 1996 | ? | Weekly | | |
| Indianapolis | Courier | 1893 | 1890s | | | |
| Indianapolis | Indianapolis Freeman | 1884 or 1888 | 1926 | Weekly | LCCN 2011254382, sn82016211; OCLC 22091308, 25863079, 764798092, 9201961 | First illustrated Black newspaper in the United States |
| Indianapolis | Indiana Herald (1957–); Hoosier Herald (1949–1957); Indianapolis Herald-Tribune (1957–1960); Indiana Herald-Times; Indianapolis Herald-Times | 1949 | 2010s | Weekly | LCCN sn84025903, sn84025904, sn84025905, sn84025906; OCLC 10637578, 10637588, 10637599, 2407308, 2701350 | Operated from 1958 to 1983 by Opal L. Tandy |
| Indianapolis | Indy Word | 1989 | ? | 14 times a year | | |
| Indianapolis | Indianapolis Leader | 1879 | 1890 | Weekly | LCCN 2013272083, sn84027490; OCLC 11257023, 4826989, 862978579; ISSN 2332-2527, 2332-2535 | Free online archive; Published by J.D. Bagby. |
| Indianapolis | Indianapolis Ledger | 1912 or 1913 | 1921? or 1925? | Weekly | LCCN 2012254025, sn85047649; OCLC 4815339, 664611244; ISSN 2574-4534, 2688-5131 | Described by one historian as "undoubtedly subsidized by the Klan".; Edited by William H. Jackson. |
| Indianapolis | Indianapolis Post; Midwestern Post | 1943 | 1947? | Weekly | LCCN sn87056553, sn87056554; OCLC 16403875, 16404030 | May have become the Hoosier Herald.; Published by Lowell M. Trice. |
| Indianapolis | Indianapolis Recorder | 1896 or 1897 | current | Weekly | LCCN sn82014475, sn84025902, 2014254306; OCLC 476120122, 10645111, 22865220, 33106332, 8797400, 8956731 | Official site; Indiana's longest-lived Black newspaper |
| Indianapolis | Indianapolis Daily Standard | 1922 | | | | |
| Indianapolis | Urban Times | 1996 (uncertain) | ? | Weekly | OCLC 37162902 | Published by Richard Bottoms.; Distinct from Indianapolis monthly of same name established 2005 |
| Indianapolis | Indianapolis Visions | 1982 (uncertain) | 1986 | Weekly, later monthly | | Edited by Jane Saxton. Published by Philip Saxton. |
| Indianapolis | Indianapolis Voice | 1957 | 1958 (uncertain) | Weekly | LCCN sn85047653; OCLC 4826884 | |
| Indianapolis | Indianapolis World, originally Indianapolis Colored World | 1883 (uncertain) | 1932 | Weekly ("generally") | LCCN sn82016212, 2012254026; OCLC 773197937, 2636827, 8950537, 9202154 | |
| Indianapolis | Indianapolis World Telegram; The World Telegram; World-Telegram | 1929 or 1939 | 1940 | Weekly or irregular | LCCN sn87056532; OCLC 16264042 | Published by G.L. Porter. |
| Muncie | The Muncie Times | 1991 | 2011 | Twice monthly or biweekly | LCCN sn95067519; OCLC 28815803 | Ceased publication after death of founder and publisher Bea Moten-Foster in 2011. |
| Richmond | Richmond Blade | 1918 | 1922 | Weekly or irregular | LCCN sn86058212; OCLC 13053364 | Motto: "Hew to the line; let the quips fall where they may." |
| Richmond | Interview | 1906 | | | | |
| Richmond | Indiana Register | 1906 | 1908 | | | |
| Terre Haute | Afro-American Journal | 1895 | 1896 | Irregular | | |
| Terre Haute | The Eagle | 1906 | Irregular | | | |
| Terre Haute | The Right Way | 1896 | 1898 | Irregular | | |
| Terre Haute | The Times | 1909 | 1912 | Irregular | | |
| Terre Haute | Vanguard News | August 5, 1994 | February 4–18, 1995 | Biweekly, then monthly | | Edited by Phillip Norton. "It is about black people taking care of business. The business of and for black people. We will also contribute to the development of a viable black community” |

== Southern Indiana ==
Southern Indiana makes up the southern third of the state, and is home to the Indiana's third-largest city Evansville, as well as smaller cities along the Ohio River.

| City | Title | Beginning | End | Frequency | Call numbers | Remarks |
|---|---|---|---|---|---|---|
| Evansville | Argus | 1938 | 1943 | Weekly | LCCN sn86058884; OCLC 14583411 | |
| Evansville | Chronicle | 1882 | Irregular | | | |
| Evansville | Clarion | 1914 | 1915 | Irregular | | |
| Evansville | Consolidated News | 1943 | 1956 (uncertain) | Weekly or irregular | LCCN sn86058885; OCLC 14583388 | |
| Evansville | Graphic | 1891 | Irregular | | | |
| Evansville | Guide | 1908 | Irregular | | | |
| Evansville | Inner City Reporter | 1981 | 1984 | Biweekly or monthly | LCCN sn87056168; OCLC 16308896 | |
| Evansville | Negro Press | 1911 | Irregular | | Political campaign tract | |
| Evansville | Our Age, later Our Weekly Age | 1875? or 1878 | ? | Weekly | | Published by Edwin Horn, who later co-founded the Indianapolis World. Published through at least 1880. |
| Evansville | Our Times Newspaper | 1983 | current | Biweekly or semimonthly | LCCN sn95067518; OCLC 27649117 | Official site |
| Evansville | Pilot | 1888 | Irregular | | | |
| Evansville | The Right Way | 1880 | Irregular | | | |
| Evansville | The Transcript | 1905 | Irregular | | | |
| Evansville | The Watch Tower | 1880s | Irregular | | | |
| New Albany | New Albany Weekly Review | 1881 | 1880s | Weekly | LCCN sn86058076, 2013254360; OCLC 13351985, 849418982 | |

== See also ==
- List of African American newspapers and media outlets
- List of African American newspapers in Illinois
- List of African American newspapers in Michigan
- List of African American newspapers in Ohio
- List of newspapers in Indiana

== Works cited ==
- Adams, Grace (2005). BAPWD, Black Authors & Published Writers Directory.
- Bigham, Darrel E. (1996). "The Black Press in Indiana, 1879-1985". In Suggs, Henry Lewis (ed.). The Black Press in the Middle West, 1865-1985. Greenwood Press. ISBN 9780313255793.
- Danky, James Philip; Hady, Maureen E., eds. (1998). African-American newspapers and periodicals : a national bibliography. Harvard University Press. ISBN 9780674007888.
- Pride, Armistead Scott; Wilson, Clint C. (1997). A History of the Black Press. Howard University Press. ISBN 9780882581927.
- Schneider, Mark Robert (2002). We Return Fighting: The Civil Rights Movement in the Jazz Age. UPNE. p. 344. ISBN 9781555534905.
