= Mary Mossell Griffin =

American writer, clubwoman and suffragist (1882–1968)

Mary Campbell Mossell Griffin (October 11, 1882 – June 4, 1968) was an American writer, clubwoman, and suffragist based in Philadelphia. She led successful efforts to pass Pennsylvania's anti-lynching law. She co-founded a summer camp with Anna J. Cooper. She wrote a 1915 text titled Afro-American Men and Women Who Count.

== Early life ==
Mary "Mazie" Campbell Mossell was born in Philadelphia, Pennsylvania, the elder daughter of Nathan Francis Mossell, a physician, and Gertrude Bustill Mossell, a writer, newspaper columnist, and editor.

She came from an unusually well-educated family: Her father was the first African-American graduate of the University of Pennsylvania School of Medicine, and a prominent member of Philadelphia's medical community. Her uncle Aaron Albert Mossell II was the first African-American from the University of Pennsylvania School of Law. Her first cousin Sadie Tanner Mossell was the first African-American woman to earn a Ph.D. in the United States, also at the University of Pennsylvania. Another first cousin was singer and activist Paul Robeson. Her mother was a member of the Bustill family; her maternal grandfather, Charles Hicks Bustill, was a prominent abolitionist in Philadelphia.

== Career ==
Mossell taught kindergarten from 1907 to 1908 in Darby, Pennsylvania. She wrote for several newspapers, including the Philadelphia Courant, the Philadelphia Tribune, and The Washington Sun. She was president of the Harriet Tubman Association (named for Harriet Tubman), and the Sojourner Truth Suffrage League (named for Sojourner Truth), and she organized the Phillis Wheatley Literary Society (named for Phyllis Wheatley). She was the author of Afro American Men and Women who Count (1915). In 1927–1928, she headed a national survey of black women wage earners. With Anna J. Cooper, she established a New Jersey summer camp for Philadelphia children.

Mary Mossell Griffin chaired the suffrage department of the Northeastern Federation of Women's Clubs during the 1910s, and of the legal department of the National Association of Colored Women during the 1920s. In the latter role, she took an active role in seeing an anti-lynching bill successfully through the Pennsylvania legislature with legislator Andrew F. Stevens. She was president of the Northeast Republican Women's Alliance in 1924. In 1940, she was selected to chair the Phillis Wheatley Monument Fund, to erect a monument at the Boston gravesite of Wheatley.

Mossell Griffin took an interest in local affairs too. In 1934, she led a successful campaign to employ black clerks at an open air produce market in Philadelphia. In 1941, she supported parents protesting about an overcrowded school in need of repairs. In 1936, Mary Mossell Griffin ran for a seat on Philadelphia's 7th Ward executive committee.

== Personal life ==
Mossell married Joshua R. Griffin Jr., a medical doctor from Richmond, Virginia, in 1909. They had one child, Francis Raleigh Griffin. She was widowed when Dr. Griffin died in 1931.

She died in Richmond in 1968.
