= Fort Wayne Ink Spot =

American biweekly newspaper

- Type: Biweekly newspaper
- Publisher: John Dortch
- Managing editor: Bryant Rozier
- Launched: 2018
- Language: American English
- City: Fort Wayne
- Country: United States
- Circulation: 1,000 (as of 2019)
- Website: Official website

The Fort Wayne Ink Spot is a biweekly newspaper published in Fort Wayne, Indiana, and is the only African-American-owned newspaper in northeast Indiana. It is sold on a subscription basis and at newsstands around the city. As of 2019, the newspaper had a circulation of approximately 1,000.

== History ==
The Ink Spot was founded in 2018 as a replacement for Frost Illustrated, a newspaper aimed at the city's minority community since the 1960s and folded in 2017. The founder was John Dortch, who also was CEO of the Fort Wayne Black Chamber of Commerce. The first issue was published on March 12, 2018, and was eight pages long. The paper's first issue was dedicated to Edward N. Smith, the former publisher of Frost Illustrated, and featured a large cover story about him.

While being the "spiritual heir" to Frost Illustrated, the Ink Spot has sought to distinguish itself by focusing more specifically on personal stories.

== See also ==
- List of African-American newspapers in Indiana
- List of newspapers in Indiana
