= Sara Pelham Speaks =

American lawyer and activist

- Sara Pelham Speaks, from a 1940 newspaper
- Born: November 7, 1902; Washington, D.C.
- Died: August 23, 1984 (aged 81); New York
- Occupations: Lawyer, politician, activist
- Parent(s): Robert Pelham Jr., Gabrielle Lewis Pelham

Sara Pelham Speaks (November 7, 1902 – August 23, 1984) was an American lawyer and activist. She was the first Black woman to be a major party's nominee for a Congressional seat, when she was the Republican candidate who opposed Adam Clayton Powell Jr. in 1944.

== Early life and education ==
Sara Pelham was born in Washington, D.C., the daughter of Robert A. Pelham and Gabrielle Lewis Pelham. Her father was a lawyer and newspaper editor; her mother was a pianist, organist, music educator, and founder of the Detroit Study Club. Her uncle was a noted civil engineer, Frederick Blackburn Pelham. Her sister was Dorothy Pelham Beckley, the second national president of Delta Sigma Theta. Pelham graduated from Dunbar High School and from the University of Michigan in 1924, where she majored in chemistry, and protested unequal treatment at a lunch counter near campus. She completed a law degree at New York University in 1936.

== Career ==
Speaks helped her father organize the Capital News Service and worked as a journalist in Washington, D.C. after college. She ran for a seat in the New York State Assembly in 1937, and won her primary, but lost the general election by a small margin. In 1944, she ran as the Republican candidate against Adam Clayton Powell Jr. for a new Congressional seat in New York City; she lost decisively, partly based on a campaign of rumors about her racial identity, but she won the endorsement of the New York Amsterdam News, and was the first Black woman to be a major party's candidate for a Congressional seat. The New York Amsterdam News framed her loss as holding the promise of future success: "The old precedent has been broken and the way opened for a Congresswoman from the ranks of Negro women. The future holds that." She was disbarred in 1948, following accusations of misconduct.

Speaks was active in the Urban League, Delta Sigma Theta, the New York State Federation of Business and Professional Women's Clubs. She worked on Republican presidential campaigns in 1932, 1936, and 1940.

== Personal life ==
Sara Pelham married physician F. Douglas Speaks in 1926; they had one son. She died in 1984, aged 81 years, in New York.
