= Fort Wayne Free Press =

Defunct American newspaper

- Type: Underground press
- Founded: 1970
- Ceased publication: 1974
- City: Fort Wayne, Indiana

The Fort Wayne Free Press was an underground press newspaper published in Fort Wayne, Indiana, between 1970 and 1974. Founded by George Relue, Tom Lewandowski, Jeff Wentz, and Ted Rhodes, its stated purpose was to "seek out and disseminate. to the public, news and opinions on social issues relating the Fort Wayne community and to act In the supporting role of community organization-for individuals and groups in the community."

The newspaper was published bi-weekly, by Babylon Publisher, a "collective of people working towards non-violent social change through active communication and community organization." The publisher was started after receiving fundraising from a battle of the bands event at IPFW. The intention was to publish bi-weekly, although the publishing schedule of the newspaper was intermittent during its first year, with the staff all being volunteers working with a shoe string budget.

Many of the founders of the paper were connected the peace movement present in Fort Wayne during the late 1960s and early 1970s. The front page of the first edition of the newspaper featured stories on the local, anti-Vietnam War movement, the current United Farm Workers grape boycott, and the questionable recent firing of a local IPFW Sociology professor. Coverage soon expanded to include civil rights, the local poverty program, police-community relations as well as "women's issues, equal rights, labor, politics, poetry, the criminal justice system, consumer advocacy, health care, gay pride, music, theater, film, and the environment." Political cartoons and comics were also featured in the newspaper. Babylon Publishers also published, for a short time, Joaquin, a small bi-weekly written, edited, and laid out by members of the local Mexican-American community. This small paper also ran as an insert in the Fort Wayne Free Press.

A digital copy of the first three years of the Fort Wayne Free Press is available at the Purdue University Fort Wayne Mastodon Digital Collection.

Other independent newspapers published in Fort Wayne during this era included Where It's At and Frost Illustrated.
