= Shining Star =

Shining Star may refer to:

== Albums ==
- Shining Star (Fish Leong album)
- Shining Star (Jerry Garcia Band album)
- Shining Star (Jump5 album)

== Songs ==
- "Shining Star" (Earth, Wind & Fire song)
- "Shining Star" (INXS song)
- "Shining Star" (Nami Tamaki song)
- "Shining Star" (The Manhattans song)
- "Shining Star", a song by Ai from My Name Is Ai
- "Shining Star", a song by Backstreet Boys from Black & Blue
- "Shining Star", a song by Bebe Rexha from Expectations
- "Shining Star", a song by Get Far
- "Shining Star", a song by Inna from Party Never Ends
- "Shining Star", a song by Misia from Kiss in the Sky
- "Shining Star", a song by Rend Collective Experiment from Homemade Worship by Handmade People

== Other media ==
- Shining Star (1969 film), Iranian film
- The Shining Star, a MediaCorp Singapore drama serial
- The Shining Star (Anderson), and African-American newspaper published in Anderson, Indiana from 1922 to 1927
- Minugu Taare (lit. 'Shining Star'), nickname of Indian Kannada cinema actress Kalpana
- "Shining Star" Chandrakanth, a character in the 2010 Indian film Payanam

== See also ==
- Shining Stars (disambiguation)
