= List of African American newspapers in Michigan =

This is a list of African American newspapers that have been published in Michigan. It includes both current and historical newspapers. The first known such newspaper in Michigan was The Venture of 1879, followed in 1883 by the Detroit Plaindealer.

== Newspapers ==
City	Title	Beginning	End	Frequency	Call numbers	Remarks
Adrian	Afro-American Journal and Directory	1895	1895			May have only published one issue.
Ann Arbor	Michigan Age	1918	1920s			Edited by G.W. Wright.
Ann Arbor	People's Advocate	1972	1900s	Irregular or triweekly	LCCN sn97070600; OCLC 38506420	Published and edited by Jeanne Fox.
Ann Arbor	The Washington Enquirer	1995	?	Weekly	OCLC 32742305	
Benton Harbor	The Citizen	1970s	?	Weekly	LCCN sn99063226; OCLC 41891021	Attested for at least 1984–1986.
Detroit	American Catholic Tribune	1885	1890s	Irregular	LCCN sn90057162, sn97016092; OCLC 10874710, 37188414	Published at Detroit from December 16, 1893 to September 8, 1894, and at other times in Cincinnati, Ohio.
Detroit	The Detroit Advocate	1900? or 1901	1901?	Weekly		Published by D. Augustus Straker.
Detroit	Black Alleged News	1900s	1900s		LCCN sn97070517; OCLC 38480175	Attested from at least 1981.
Detroit	Blade Express	1938	1938			
Detroit	Changeover	1970	1970s	Monthly newspaper	LCCN sn94053291; OCLC 31230548	
Detroit	The Detroit Contender	1920	1921? or 1922	Weekly		Edited by Robert L. Poston.
Detroit	Correspondence	1956	1963?	Monthly newspaper	OCLC 4310181	
Detroit	Detroit Courier	1966	1967			
Detroit	Detroit's News & Views; Community Views (1960s)	1960s	1900s	Weekly	News & Views: LCCN sn98066102; OCLC 39136408; Community Views: LCCN sn97070649; OCLC 38415062	Attested for at least 1964–1970.
Detroit	Detroit Epic News	1960s	1900s	Irregular	LCCN sn98066398; OCLC 39691824	Attested through at least 1972.
Detroit	Garvey's Voice	1950s	1900s	Monthly newspaper	LCCN sn99065154; OCLC 41470622	Attested in at least 1953.
Detroit	The Ghetto Speaks	1971?	?	Biweekly	OCLC 12158938	Edited by Harvey Grant.; Sought to "provid[e] a forum for the community to expose the racism it experiences from day to day."
Detroit	Guardian	1938	1938	Weekly [note that some sources say it was publishing by 1934 or 1935]		Edited by Charles Roxborough.
Detroit	The Detroit Herald	1916	1916?	Weekly	LCCN sn98066192; OCLC 39065275	Edited and published by George E. Smedley.
Detroit	Illustrated News	1961	1964			
Detroit	The Detroit Independent	1922 or 1923	1931? or 1938	Weekly	LCCN 2013254034, sn98066190; OCLC 664617074, 39064818	Edited by William J. Robinson.
Detroit	The Detroit Informer	1897	1916	Weekly	LCCN sn83016519, 2011254361, sn83016519; OCLC 747845714, 9873707, 2611132	
Detroit	Inner-city Voice; Sauti, the Inner-City Voice (October–November 1969)	1967	1971	Monthly newspaper	LCCN sn94053353; OCLC 11366055	Billed as the "Organ of the League of Revolutionary Black Worker[s]."
Detroit	The Interracial Review	1900s	1900s	Monthly newspaper	LCCN sn98066275; OCLC 39064526	Attested from at least 1944.; Edited and published by Mason Smith.
Detroit	Detroit Journal	1967	1900s	Weekly	LCCN sn97070601; OCLC 38302828	
Detroit	Judgment	1900s	1900s	Weekly	LCCN sn97070655; OCLC 38414316	Attested from at least 1970.
Detroit	The Detroit Leader	1910	1923	Weekly	LCCN sn98066264; OCLC 39088105	Attested from at least 1910.
Detroit	Michigan Chronicle	1936	current	Weekly	ISSN 1949-9620; LCCN sn83045324; OCLC 2264134, 27945745	Official site; Founded by former Chicago Defender executive editor Louis E. Martin.; Purchased by Real Times Media in 2003.
Detroit	The Michigan FrontPage	2000	current	Weekly	ISSN 1546-4466; LCCN 2003215854; OCLC 44590243	Purchased by Real Times Media in 2003.
Detroit	Michigan Scene	1966	1966			
Detroit	Michigan World	1930s	1930s			Edited by Petry Fisher.
Detroit	National Independent	1891	1903	Weekly		
Detroit	New Era	1920s	1920s			
Detroit	New World	1938	1938			
Detroit	Northwest News	1922	1938			
Detroit	The Oakland Lion	1969	1969?	Biweekly	LCCN sn97070519; OCLC 38479996	
Detroit	The Owl	1926	?	Weekly		Attested through at least 1929.; Edited by John W. Roxborough and H.C. Patton.
Detroit	Paradise Valley News	1937	1937	Weekly	LCCN sn98066094; OCLC 39224776	Edited by Roy L. Lightfoot.
Detroit	The Detroit Peoples News	1925?	1930?	Weekly	LCCN sn98066232; OCLC 39178442	Active in 1927.; Edited by Beulah Young.
Detroit	The Plaindealer; Detroit Plaindealer	1883	1895 or 1893	Weekly	LCCN 2014254022, sn83016683; OCLC 664611349, 9975654	Published simultaneously at Detroit and Cincinnati from April 8, 1892 to 1893.; Sometimes considered the first African American newspaper in Detroit.
Detroit	Point Of Production	1972	?	Monthly newspaper	LCCN sn94053393; OCLC 17616095	Official newspaper of the Black Workers Congress.
Detroit	Detroit Republic	1890s	?		LCCN sn99065133; OCLC 41249972	Billed as "[t]he official colored Republican organ of the state."; Extant at least in 1896.
Detroit	The Detroit Sun	1944?	1944?	Weekly	LCCN sn98066095; OCLC 39224844	
Detroit	Detroit Telegram	1920s	1920s			Edited by E. Adams.
Detroit	Detroit Tribune; The Tribune Independent Of Michigan (1933–1935)	1922 or 1933	1966	Weekly	Tribune (1933): ISSN 2577-2546, 2577-2538; LCCN 2018218642, sn83016294; OCLC 1028641252, 9671902; Tribune Independent: ISSN 2577-2570, 2577-2562; LCCN 2018218643, sn96076588; OCLC 1028674923, 5998213; The Detroit Tribune (1935–); ISSN 2577-3518, 2577-350X; LCCN 2018218653, sn92063852; OCLC 1029203520, 26654010	Free online archives: The Detroit Tribune, Detroit Tribune of 1933, Tribune Independent
Detroit	The Vanguard	1962	?	Monthly newspaper	LCCN sn97070618; OCLC 38489309	Attested from at least 1970.
Detroit	The Venture	1879	1882	Monthly newspaper		Published by Benjamin Pelham.; Chiefly literary in content.
Detroit	Detroit World	1931	1932			"[A]n organ of the Scott Newspaper Syndicate."
East Lansing	The Chronicle	1988	current	Weekly	LCCN sn97070746; OCLC 32608313	
Ecorse	The Telegram	1943? or 1944	current	Weekly	OCLC 28406836	Official site
Flint	The Bronze Reporter	1953	1900s	Weekly	LCCN sn96076910; OCLC 35177303	Published by John W. Caldwell, ed.
Flint	Flint Brownies News Flint Brownsville Weekly News (1930s–1939) Flint Brownsville News (1939–1942)	1939	1900s	Weekly	Brownsville News: LCCN sn96076909; OCLC 35168988; Brownsville Weekly News: LCCN sn96076907; OCLC 35168948	
Flint	The Courier	1982?	?	Weekly	OCLC 32294610	Edited by Avery Aldridge.
Flint	Enterprise	1920	1923			
Flint	The Flint Mirror; The Mirror (1964)	1964	1900s	Twice-monthly or monthly	Flint Mirror: LCCN sn96076899; OCLC 35168887; The Mirror: LCCN sn96076898; OCLC 35168835	Edited and published by Edward Jones.
Flint	The North Star	1955	1900s	Weekly	LCCN sn2001063758; OCLC 48121103	
Flint	The Flint Spokesman	1946	1900s	Weekly	LCCN sn96076919; OCLC 35183405	Published and edited by Frank L. Gillespie.; Attested through at least 1979.
Fowler	The Lansing Post	1963	?	Monthly newspaper	LCCN sn2001061621; OCLC 46670243	
Grand Rapids	Afro-American Gazette	1991	1996?	Weekly	OCLC 24401511	Published by Patricia Grier.
Grand Rapids	Michigan State News	1911	1926			Edited by G.W. Smith.
Grand Rapids	The Organizer	1969	1980s		LCCN sn00062625; OCLC 44803417	
Grand Rapids	Times; The Grand Rapids Times (1960–)	1957	current	Weekly	Times: LCCN sn97070786; OCLC 38010474; The Grand Rapids Times: LCCN sn88063029; OCLC 17430946	Official site; Published by John Bankston.
Highland Park	Michigan Citizen	1978	2014	Weekly	ISSN 1072-2041; LCCN sn93006432; OCLC 22836894	Free online archive; Published by Charles D. Kelly.
Idlewild	The Challenger	1900s	?	Twice-monthly	LCCN sn97063466; OCLC 38035834	Attested from at least 1951.
Inkster	Voice; Inkster Voice	1948		Weekly		Edited by Frank M. Seymour.; Circulation of 18,800 in 1948. Fell to 1,600 in 1950s.
Jackson	The Blazer News	1962 or 1963	current	Weekly	OCLC 27355246	Official site
Kalamazoo	The Community Courier	1972 or 1973	1900s	Weekly	LCCN sn96077137; OCLC 35709898	
Kalamazoo	Focus News	1965	?	Monthly newspaper		
Kalamazoo	Star Reporter	1964	1960s	Weekly	LCCN sn96077113; OCLC 35690193	Published by Mall City Pub. Co.
Kalamazoo	The Kalamazoo Weekly Star Weekly Star (1965) Kalamazoo Weekly Star (1965–)	1963	1900s	Weekly	Weekly Star; LCCN sn96077114; OCLC 35690238; Kalamazoo Weekly Star: LCCN sn96077115; OCLC 35690334	Published and edited by Reuben Cummings.
Lansing	Eye Opener	1930	1931			
Lansing	The Inner City Times	1968	1900s	Weekly	LCCN sn97063327; OCLC 12224847	
Lansing	The Metroplex Michigan	1980s	1990s	Irregular		Followed by Metroplex news.; Description based on: Vol. 3, no. 6 (Nov. 8, 1987).; .
Lansing	The Metroplex Michigan; Metroplex News	1987?	?	Biweekly or irregular	The Metroplex Michigan: LCCN sn2001061639; OCLC 27986118; Metroplex News: LCCN sn2001061640; OCLC 46671765	Published by Conrad B. Parrish.; Attested through at least 1994.
Lansing	The Michigan Bulletin	1995	current	Monthly or biweekly	LCCN sn2001061641; OCLC 35703277	Official site; Free newspaper.
Lansing	Michigan State Echo	1938	Weekly			First of the Echo newspapers established by Leroy G. White.
Lansing	The New Citizens Press	2002	current	Biweekly	LCCN sn2003060104; OCLC 52095947	Official site
Lansing	Response	1980s	?	Monthly newspaper	LCCN sn2001061633; OCLC 46673212	Attested through at least 1981.
Lansing	The Lansing Times	1975	?	Weekly	LCCN sn2001061623; OCLC 46670305	
Lansing	Westside News	1969	?	Weekly	LCCN sn97063317; OCLC 12486592	
Lathrup Village	Michigan Sentinel	1991	?	Monthly newspaper	OCLC 27428223	Published by Elaine Campbell.
Pontiac	The Pontiac Commentator	1947	?	Weekly	LCCN sn97060406; OCLC 36831602	
Pontiac	Pontiac-Auburn Citizen’s Post	1987?	?	Weekly	OCLC 32294968	Published by Dave Morris.; Attested through at least 1995.
Royal Oak	The Peaceful Valley Journal	1900s	1900s	Weekly	LCCN sn98066314; OCLC 39397945	Attested at least from 1952.
Saginaw	The Saginaw Afro Herald	1967?	?	Weekly	LCCN sn97070589; OCLC 38263075	Published by United Power.; Motto: "To inform, involve and unite."
Saginaw	Saginaw Banner	1995?	?	Weekly	OCLC 32295111	Published by D. Lyons.

== See also ==
- List of African American newspapers and media outlets
- List of African American newspapers in Indiana
- List of African American newspapers in Ohio
- List of African American newspapers in Wisconsin
- List of newspapers in Michigan

== Works cited ==
- Aiello, Thomas (2018). The Grapevine of the Black South: The Scott Newspaper Syndicate in the Generation before the Civil Rights Movement. University of Georgia Press. p. 112. ISBN 9780820354453.
- Danky, James Philip; Hady, Maureen E., eds. (1998). African-American newspapers and periodicals : a national bibliography. Harvard University Press. ISBN 9780674007888.
- Pride, Armistead Scott; Wilson, Clint C. (1997). A History of the Black Press. Howard University Press. ISBN 9780882581927.
- Thompson, Julius Eric (1996). "An Urban Voice of the People: The Black Press in Michigan, 1865-1985". In Suggs, Henry Lewis (ed.). The Black Press in the Middle West, 1865-1985. Greenwood Press. ISBN 9780313255793.
