= Indianapolis Ledger =

American newspaper, 1910s and 1920s

The Indianapolis Ledger (1912–192?) was a newspaper in Indianapolis, Indiana. It was published and edited by John Dalphin Howard. It marketed itself as a "colored newspaper for the home devoted to the interests of the race in Indiana." William A. Chambers worked for the paper. Arthur D. Williams also served at the paper and was involved with baseball.

The paper covered black baseball. It noted Madame Walker arriving at a game in a limousine and engaged in a campaign to stem "drinking, gambling, and rowdiness" at the baseball park. It published second baseman Wallace C. Gordon's poem on race relations.

Howard was photographed with Elwood C. Knox (son of George L. Knox and a manager of the Indianapolis Freeman), Andrew Rube Foster, and C. J. Taylor after the Indianapolis ABCs won a World Series Championship.

== See also ==
- List of African American newspapers in Indiana
- Indianapolis Freeman
