= Meta Pelham =

American journalist and clubwoman (1855–1941)

- Born: Meta Elizabeth Pelham; October 25, 1855; Fredericksburg, Virginia, U.S.
- Died: August 2, 1941 (aged 85)
- Resting place: Elmwood Cemetery, Detroit, Michigan, U.S.
- Occupations: Journalist, educator, writer, clubwoman
- Relatives: Robert Pelham Jr. (brother), Benjamin Pelham (brother); Frederick B. Pelham (brother)

Meta Pelham (October 25, 1855 – August 2, 1941) was an American journalist and clubwoman. She wrote for the Detroit Plaindealer.

== Early life ==
Meta Elizabeth Pelham was born in the free black community of Fredericksburg, Virginia in 1855, to Robert A. Pelham and Frances (Butcher) Pelham. The family, including younger brother Robert Pelham Jr., moved to Detroit, Michigan. Her younger brother Frederick Blackburn Pelham, was born in Detroit, attended Detroit Public schools, and graduated from the University of Michigan with a B.S. degree in civil engineering. Pelham was one of only four black students in her class, and she graduated valedictorian. She then attended Fenton College Normal School in central Michigan.

== Career ==
Pelham briefly taught school in the American South, but returned home to Detroit due to bad health. Around 1886, she joined the editorial staff of the Detroit Plaindealer as a writer. She wrote for other newspapers as well. By historian Gloria Wade-Gayles's count, Pelham was one of 46 black newswomen whose work was published between 1883 and 1905.

Pelham was a member of the Michigan State Association of Colored Women (a chapter of the National Association of Colored Women), the Detroit Study Club, and the Detroit Federation of Women's Clubs. In 1925, Pelham encouraged African-American women to join her in the field of journalism or to help fund a black newspaper, so that positive news about the African-American Detroiters would reach the public.

== Death ==
Pelham died in 1941, aged 85. She is buried in the Pelham family plot in Elmwood Cemetery, Detroit.
