= Mamie Geraldine Neale Bledsoe =

American educator and civil rights activist

Mamie Neale Bledsoe
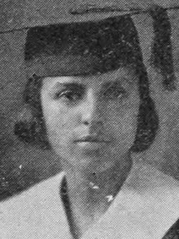
- Mamie Geraldine Neale Bledsoe, from a 1924 publication.
- Born: Mamie Geraldine Neale; 1900; Louisburg, North Carolina, US
- Died: March 1, 1991 (aged 90–91); Detroit, Michigan, US
- Occupations: civil rights activist, government official

Mamie Geraldine Neale Bledsoe (1900 – March 1, 1991) was an American educator and civil rights activist, director of the Equal Employment Opportunity Division of Michigan. She was inducted into the Michigan Women's Hall of Fame in 1983.

== Early life ==
Mamie Geraldine "Gerry" Neale was born in Louisburg, North Carolina, and raised in Freehold, New Jersey, the daughter of Thomas Neale and Ellen Gatsey Neale. She earned a teaching certificate at Trenton Normal School in 1919, and was enrolled in a summer course at Rutgers University, where she met and dated Paul Robeson. She finished a bachelor's degree at Howard University and became a member of the Alpha chapter of Alpha Kappa Alpha sorority.

== Career ==
Bledsoe moved to Michigan with her husband in the 1920s and worked as a teacher in an adult literacy program. She worked for the Works Progress Administration during the Depression. She was an interviewer for the Michigan Unemployment Compensation Commission (the Michigan Employment Security Commission). She was a member of the Detroit Study Club, a black women's literary organization in the city. She served on the board of the Detroit chapter of the NAACP and in the Women's Division of the United Negro College Fund.

Bledsoe was director of Michigan's Equal Employment Opportunity Division when she retired in 1970. In 1980 she received the "Distinguished Warrior Award" from the Detroit Urban League. In 1983 she was in the first class of inductees elected to the Michigan Women's Hall of Fame.

== Personal life ==
Mamie Neale married lawyer Harold Edward Bledsoe in 1924. They had three children, Cornelia, Geraldine, and William. Her daughter Geraldine Bledsoe Ford and her son William Bledsoe III both became judges. Her daughter, Cornelia, developed an early preschool program in Detroit that became the prototype for the national Head Start program. She was widowed when Harold died in 1974. She died in 1991, aged 91, at her daughter's home in Detroit. The Michigan legislature issued a memorial resolution soon after her death, recounting her achievements.
