= Gary Crusader =

Newspaper published in Gary, Indiana, United States

Coordinates: 41.587°N 87.3367°W

The Gary Crusader
- "The Militant Voice of the People"
- Format: Newspaper
- Owner: Dorothy Leavell
- Founder(s): Balm L. Leavell and Joseph H. Jefferson
- Publisher: The Crusader Newspaper Group
- Founded: 1961
- Language: English
- Headquarters: 1549 Broadway, Gary, Indiana 46407
- City: Gary, Indiana
- Circulation: 56,519
- Sister newspapers: The Chicago Crusader
- ISSN: 1930-7012
- OCLC number: 9694324
- Website: https://chicagocrusader.com/category/gary-local-news/

The Gary Crusader is a newspaper based in Gary, Indiana, United States, which has been featured in national newspapers for its focus on the African-American community. It was founded in 1961 and became part of the Crusader Newspaper Group founded by Balm L. Leavell and Joseph H. Jefferson. The Crusader Newspaper Group, founded in 1940, consists of The Chicago Crusader and, since 1961, the Gary Crusader. The newspaper is currently run by Balm L. Leavell's wife, Dorothy Leavell, chairman of the National Newspaper Publishers Association.

The Crusader was established to shed light on the civil rights movement, African-American culture, and news about the Gary African-American community. The Editor of the Gary Crusader is Sharon Fountain. The current publisher for the Gary Crusader, Dorothy Leavell, is stationed in Chicago, Illinois, in their larger sister organization, the Chicago Crusader. This paper has a twice-weekly print release, while also maintaining a daily article update on their website. They have a print circulation of just over fifty-six thousand copies. The Gary Crusader is the sixth largest newspaper in the state, while also being the largest ethnic-based newspaper in Indiana. Located just over 25 miles from downtown Chicago, it is well known in the Northwest Indiana region.

The Gary Crusader was founded in 1961. The publication was created as a way to give a voice to the African-American population in the Northwest Region of Indiana. In the very turbulent year of 1968 for the African-American community, with the assassination of Dr. Martin Luther King Jr. and Democratic Presidential Candidate Robert F. Kennedy, founder Balm L. Leavell died. His wife, Dorothy Leavell assumed the role of Publisher.

== Dorothy Leavell's influence and awards ==
When Dorothy assumed the position of publisher, she brought with her a breadth of knowledge regarding newspaper publication and innovations in the workplace. Dorothy is the former president and current chairman of the National Newspaper Publishers Association. In December 2015, publisher Dorothy R. Leavell was inducted into the National Association of Black Journalists Hall of Fame.

The latest recognition comes from the National Association of Black Journalists (NABJ), who recently announced its 2015-2016 Hall of Fame Inductees, the highest recognition given by the organization. On Wednesday, December 16, 2015 as part of the NABJ's 40th Anniversary Gala, Dorothy R. Leavell will be among those inducted into its Hall of Fame. — Milwaukee Courier

== The Leavells mentioned in books ==
In Dharathula "Dolly" H. Millender's 2003 book, Gary's Central Business Community, founder Balm L. Leavell was mentioned as being present when then-Gary Mayor Visclosky signed a proclamation acknowledging "Negro History Week". Balm Leavell is shown to be present at the signing due to being the publisher of the Gary Crusader, along with "Jesse Mitchell (4th District City Councilwoman) Dolly Millender (chair of observance), Cleo Wesson (5th District City Councilman) and H. Theo Tatum (principal of Roosevelt High School and author of the first brief history of the 'Negro'". The Gary Crusader also contributed photographs to this book.

The Encyclopedia of African American Business: K-Z featured Dorothy Leavell, citing that "When Dorothy R. Leavell was elected chair of Amalgamated Publishers Incorporated in April 2002, she became the first woman to head the oldest African-American-owned advertising placement firm that represents more than 200 black newspapers in at least seventy-five markets across the United States and is considered a preeminent source on reaching and motivating African American consumers."

== The Gary Crusader featured in publications ==
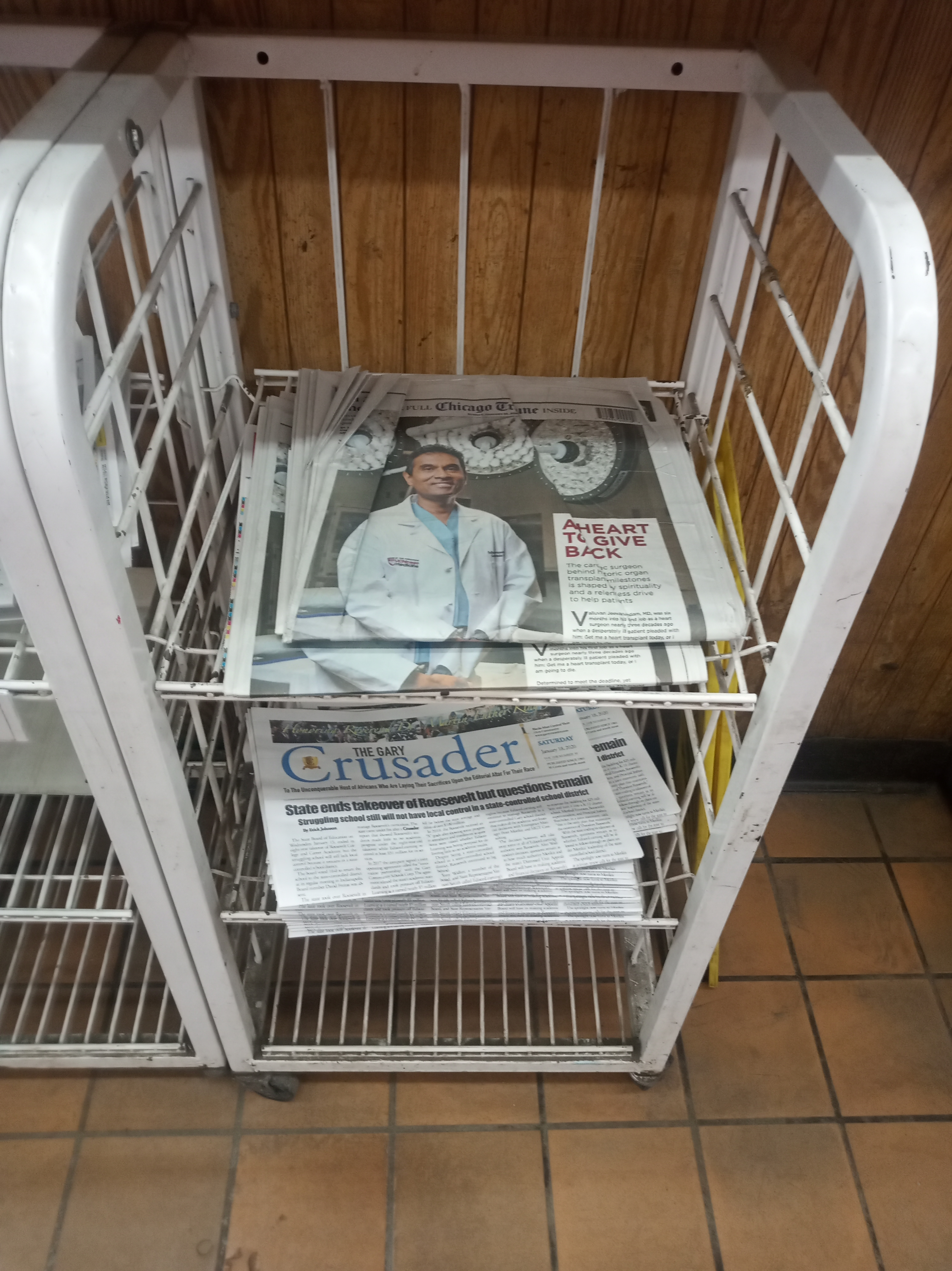
racks

The Chicago Tribune covered the death of Chuck Deggans, a beloved radio host and columnist who wrote for both the Post and for the Gary Crusader. The article titled "Columnist, radio host, Deggans dead at 82" acknowledges Deggans' work for the Post-Tribune as well as for the Gary Crusader:

Deggans, 82, was widely known for his social and entertainment column 'Chuck Deggans' Den', which is published in the Gary Crusader weekly newspaper. He was a former columnist for the Post-Tribune.

On December 28, 1997, the Chicago Tribune sought the commentary of The Gary Crusader's publisher, Dorothy Leavell, when the Chicago Defender, an African-American newspaper, closed its doors. Dorothy Leavell is quoted as saying: "The two questions you hear most often are, 'Is God dead?' and 'Is there a need for a black press?'" The Chicago Tribune discussed the aftermath of Michael Jackson's visit to the city of Gary in 2003. The pop star was initially in works of creating a possible creative arts center and amusement park in tribute to the icon. Many members of the community believed the negotiations were simply a publicity stunt to bring attention to Gary's past as well as aid in the public opinion of Jackson as he faced child-molestation charges. The Chicago Tribune quoted Antonio Leavell, 40, general manager of the Gary Crusader newspaper, as saying:

It gave Gary a day where everyone could see their favorite rock star... It was definitely a lift for Gary. Everybody was happy to see him, even though he had not been there for several years. A lot of promises were made about how the city was going to re-establish a relationship and bring some of what has been missing back to the city of Gary. But what can you expect if nothing has been done with him for numerous years?

== See also ==
- Gary Indiana
- List of African-American newspapers in Indiana
