= Dharathula Millender =

American librarian and historian

- Born: February 4, 1920; Terre Haute, Indiana, United States
- Died: December 25, 2015 (aged 95)
- Education: Indiana State Teachers College; Purdue University
- Occupation: Librarian

Dharathula "Dolly" Millender (February 4, 1920 – December 25, 2015) was an African American librarian, educator, historian, and author. She dedicated much of her life to the preservation of the history of Gary, Indiana and was frequently referred to as the city's historian. Millender founded the Gary Historical and Cultural Society and wrote multiple books on the city's history.

== Early life and education ==
Dharathula Hood was born in Terre Haute, Indiana on February 4, 1920. Hood was the sixth of eight children born to Daisy Eslick Hood, an active member of the NAACP and co-founder of several organizations providing social services to Black women, and Orestes Hood, who became the first African American professional staff member at Purdue University. She attended Wiley High School and graduated in 1937.

She studied English, music appreciation, and library science at Indiana State Teacher's College, receiving her bachelor's degree in 1941. She went on to earn a master's degree in educational media from Purdue University in 1968.

== Library career ==
Millender's first professional position was as a teacher and school librarian in Trenton, South Carolina, from 1941 to 1942. The library in Trenton was one of only two libraries that she could work at as an African American. She then moved to La Plata, Maryland, in 1942 to take a library position. Millender worked for the Library of Congress for a short time in 1943. She moved to Pennsylvania later in 1943 to take a position at the Indiantown Gap Military Reservation. She worked as the librarian for a Baltimore, Maryland junior high school from 1952 to 1960.

In 1960, Millender moved to Gary, Indiana, to become the librarian of Pulaski Junior High School. She was in that role until retiring from library work in 1978.

== Service to Gary, Indiana ==
Millender was active in local politics after moving to Gary. She served on the board of trustees for the Gary Public Library in the 1960s and 1970s. She ran twice unsuccessfully for a position on the Gary City Council before she won in 1980, becoming the first Black woman to win an at-large position on the council. She was elected to that position multiple times, serving from 1980 to 1992. In 1992 she was elected as an at-large representative for the Gary Community School Corporation, serving the Gary School system in that role from 1992 to 2004.

Millender served as the first editor of the Gary Crusader, a newspaper founded in 1961 and focused on the African American community.

In 1976, Millender founded the Gary Historical and Cultural Society (GHCS), an organization dedicated to "uplift and enrich the Gary, Indiana and surrounding communities by preserving, developing and sponsoring cultural, historical & educational programs for citizens of all ages." She also founded the Gary Writer's Conference, which supported local community writers and poets. In the early 1980s, she helped reestablish the symphony in Gary, creating the Gary Civic Symphony Orchestra after the original orchestra left the city and became the Northwest Indiana Symphony Orchestra. Millender and a group of volunteers collaborated in 1984 to ensure the preservation of the city's first building, the Gary Land Company Building, helping to secure National Historic Landmark Status. Millender was essential in encouraging the return of radio station WLTH to Gary from Chicago in 2013. She and daughter Naomi hosted a weekly radio program on WLTH, "Telling Our Gary Stories."

== Honors and legacy ==
A mural on the second floor of the Gary Public Library features Millender along with other individuals and groups important to Gary history. She was inducted into the Steel City Hall of Fame in 2003, which recognizes individuals who "make broad, significant, and multiple contributions to the Gary community or to society at large." She also received the Governor's Award for Outstanding Historic Preservation in Indiana. In 2010, she was proclaimed the "official historian" of Gary.

In February 1999, U.S. Representative Pete Visclosky included Millender as one of ten "outstanding African-American leaders" recognized for their "devotion to public service and their ability to inspire future generations." Millender was described on the House floor as "the historian of Gary, Indiana" and commended for her work in sharing information about Gary's African American history.

After her death, Mayor Karen Freeman-Wilson proclaimed that Millender's "excitement to share her vast learning and wisdom made her one of the most respected and beloved public figures in the city of Gary". Former Mayor Richard G. Hatcher described her as "a great historian and writer," saying "she single-handedly saved the culture of the city of Gary when the symphony moved to the county".

== Personal life and death ==
She married Justyn Lafayette Millender and they had two children, Naomi and Justine. Millender died December 25, 2015.

== Published works ==
- Crispus Attucks, Boy of Valor (1965)
- Real Negroes, Honest Settings: Children's and Young People's Books About Negro Life and History (1967)
- Yesterday in Gary: a Brief History of the Negro in Gary, 1906-1967 (1967)
- Martin Luther King, Jr., Boy with a Dream (1969)
- Louis Armstrong, Young Music Maker (1972)
