= Andrew F. Stevens =

American banker and politician

Andrew F. Stevens (1866-1951) was a banker and politician in Pennsylvania who served as a state legislator. He was African American. He was elected in 1919.

He was the junior partner in Brown & Stevens, which invested in the Quality Amusement Co.

He lived in Philadelphia. He was a Republican. John C. Asbury also elected to Pennsylvania's legislature in 1919.

He helped pass an anti-lynching bill supported by Mossell Griffin, chair of the legislative department of the National Association of Colored Women.

== See also ==
- List of African-American officeholders (1900–1959)
