= Nathan Francis Mossell =

American physician (1856–1946)

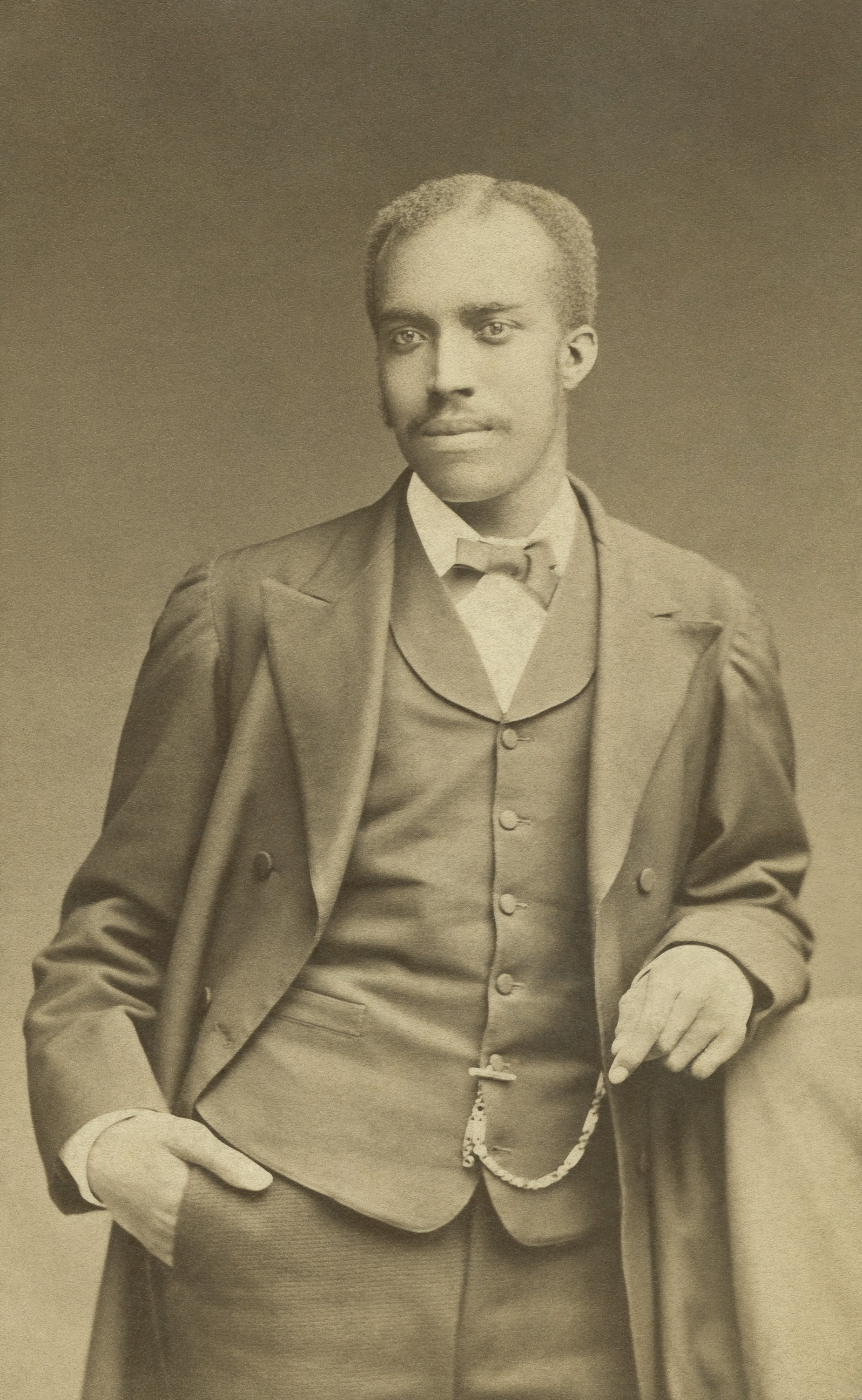
- Born: July 27, 1856; Hamilton, Province of Canada
- Died: October 27, 1946 (aged 90); Philadelphia, Pennsylvania, U.S.
- Education: Lincoln University; University of Pennsylvania (1882) M.D.
- Spouse: Gertrude Emily Hicks Bustill
- Children: Florence and Mary Campbell Mossell
- Parent(s): Aaron Albert Mossell I Eliza Bowers
- Relatives: Aaron Albert Mossell (brother); Sadie Tanner Mossell (niece); Paul Robeson (nephew); Mary Ella Mossell (sister-in-law); Charles Hicks Bustill (father-in-law)

Nathan Francis Mossell (July 27, 1856 – October 27, 1946) was an American physician who was the first African-American graduate of the University of Pennsylvania School of Medicine in 1882. He did post-graduate training at hospitals in Philadelphia and London. In 1888, he was the first black physician elected as member of the Philadelphia County Medical Society in Pennsylvania. He was active in the NAACP and also helped found the Frederick Douglass Memorial Hospital and Training School in West Philadelphia in 1895, which he led as chief-of-staff and medical director until he retired in 1933. Gertrude Bustill Mossell was his wife.

== Early life and education ==
Mossell was born in Hamilton, Canada, in 1856, the fourth of nine children. Both his parents, Eliza Bowers (1824 – 1878) and Aaron Albert Mossell I (1824 – 1910), were descended from freed slaves. According to Mossell's autobiography, his mother's stories of the discrimination and hardship their families faced strengthened her own children's determination to succeed. Mossell's maternal grandfather had resisted all attempts by his owner to make him work and was eventually freed. He married and settled in Baltimore, but the entire family, including Mossell's mother, who was a child at the time, were deported to Trinidad. Mossell's paternal grandfather, who had been transported from the coast of West Africa, managed to buy his freedom and that of his wife. He too settled in Baltimore, where Mossell's father was born.

Mossell's parents met and married in Baltimore after his mother's family return from Trinidad. His father learned the brickmaking trade and saved enough money to buy a house. After the birth of their second child, the couple decided to move to Canada, as free blacks were prohibited from being educated in Maryland and they wanted education for their children, and the Fugitive Slave Act of 1850 threatened their freedom. They sold their house in Baltimore and settled in Hamilton, Ontario. His father bought a tract of clay-bearing land and set up his own brickworks.

Mossell's siblings were the following:

- Mary Elizabeth (1848 - 1920) born in Maryland, married Abraham Denny
- Charles Wesley (1850 - 1915) born in Maryland. He graduated from Lincoln University and studied theology in Boston, later becoming a missionary in Haiti. Husband of Mary Ella Forrester.
- James, (c. 1853 – c. 1870), born in Canada and died in Lockport, New York.
- Alvarilla or Alvaretta (b. 1857 – 1880), born in Hamilton, Canada. She worked with her brother Charles as a missionary in Haiti and died there of yellow fever.
- triplets (Minnie, Kate, Frances) born in Canada in 1860, died before 1865.
- Aaron Albert Mossell II (1863–1951), born in Hamilton, Canada. He was the first African American to graduate from the University of Pennsylvania Law School. He married Mary Louisa Tanner (1866–1934). In 1921 their daughter Sadie Tanner Mossell (1898–1989) became the first African-American woman to receive a PhD in the United States, earning a degree in economics at the University of Pennsylvania.

During the Civil War, the family moved back to the United States, settling in Lockport, New York, where Mossell's father again owned his own brickmaking business. Along with his siblings, Mossell attended the local public school in Lockport. His schooling became erratic once he started working part-time at age nine for his father. He eventually joined his elder brother Charles at Lincoln University, a historically black college in Pennsylvania, where he studied Natural Science, receiving his Bachelor of Arts degree in 1879.

== Later life and medical career ==
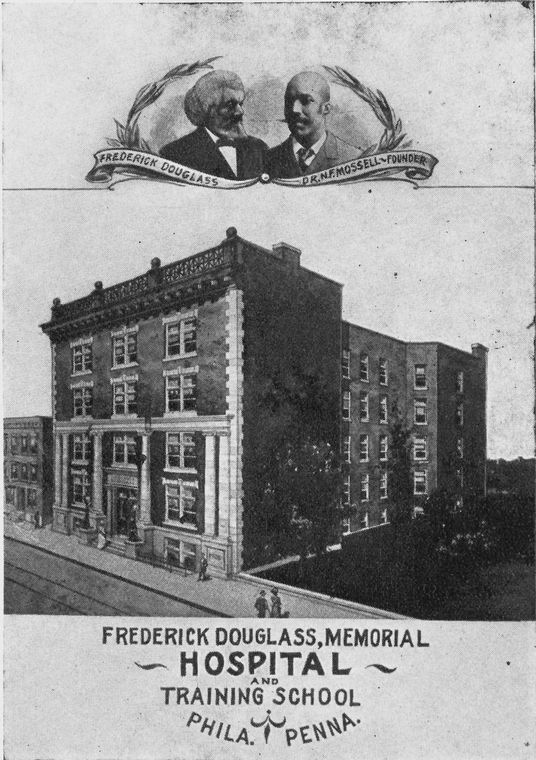
Frederick Douglass Memorial Hospital which Nathan Mossell helped found in 1895

Mossell went on to study at the University of Pennsylvania School of Medicine (PENN). He earned his medical degree in 1882. He was PENN's first African-American medical school graduate. He did post-graduate training at hospitals in Philadelphia, including the Pennsylvania University Hospital, and later at Guy's Hospital, Queen's Hospital, and St Thomas' Hospital in London.

After his return to the United States, in 1888 Mossell became the first black physician elected as member of the Philadelphia County Medical Society. That year he also started his private practice. In 1895, he helped found the Frederick Douglass Memorial Hospital and Training School in West Philadelphia, serving as its chief-of-staff and medical director until his retirement in 1933.

== Marriage and family ==
He married Gertrude Emily Hicks Bustill (1848–1955), a member of the prominent Bustill family, on July 12, 1893, in Philadelphia. The couple had two daughters, Florence Mossell and Mary Campbell Mossell. Gertrude was the mixed-race daughter of Charles Hicks Bustill (1816–1890), who was of African, European and Lenape ancestry, and Emily Robinson. Gertrude's sister and brother-in law, Maria Louisa Bustill and William Drew Robeson, were the parents of the singer, actor, and Civil Rights advocate Paul Robeson.

== Private practice ==
After retiring as director of the hospital in 1933, Mossell continued to work in his private practice, which he had opened in 1888.

He died on October 27, 1946, in Philadelphia at the age of 90. He was believed to be the oldest practicing black physician at the time of his death.
