= Gertrude Bustill Mossell =

American journalist, author, teacher, and activist (1855–1948

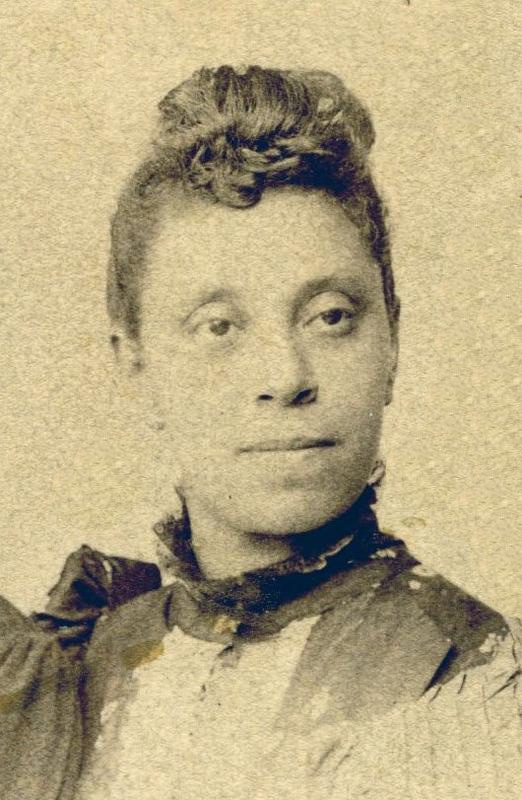
- Born: Gertrude Emily Hicks Bustill; July 3, 1855; Philadelphia, Pennsylvania, U.S.
- Died: January 21, 1948 (aged 92); Philadelphia, Pennsylvania, U.S.
- Other name: Mrs. N. F. Mossell
- Occupations: Journalist, author, teacher, and activist
- Spouse: Nathan Francis Mossell
- Parent: Charles Hicks Bustill
- Relatives: Bustill family

Gertrude Emily Hicks Bustill Mossell (July 3, 1855 – January 21, 1948) was an American journalist, author, teacher, and activist. She served as the women's editor of The New York Age from 1885 to 1889, and of the Indianapolis World from 1891 to 1892. She strongly supported the development of black newspapers and advocated for more women to enter journalism.

== Early life and education ==
Gertrude Bustill was born in Philadelphia, Pennsylvania, on July 3, 1855, to Emily Robinson and Charles Hicks Bustill, members of the prominent Bustill family. Her great-grandfather, Cyrus Bustill, served in George Washington's troops as a baker during the American Revolution. After the war, he maintained a successful bakery in Philadelphia and co-founded the first black mutual-aid society in America, the Free African Society. Among the many other Bustills of distinction are Gertrude's great-aunt, abolitionist and educator Grace Bustill Douglass and Grace's daughter, activist and artist Sarah Mapps Douglass.

Mossell's father encouraged her education from an early age. She attended public school in Philadelphia at the Institute for Colored Youth and the Robert Vaux Grammar School. Upon graduation, she was asked to deliver a graduation speech. The speech, entitled "Influence", impressed Bishop Henry McNeal Turner, editor of the African Methodist Episcopal newspaper, The Christian Recorder. McNeal published "Influence" and invited Mossell to contribute poetry and essays to the newspaper.

== Journalism and writing career ==
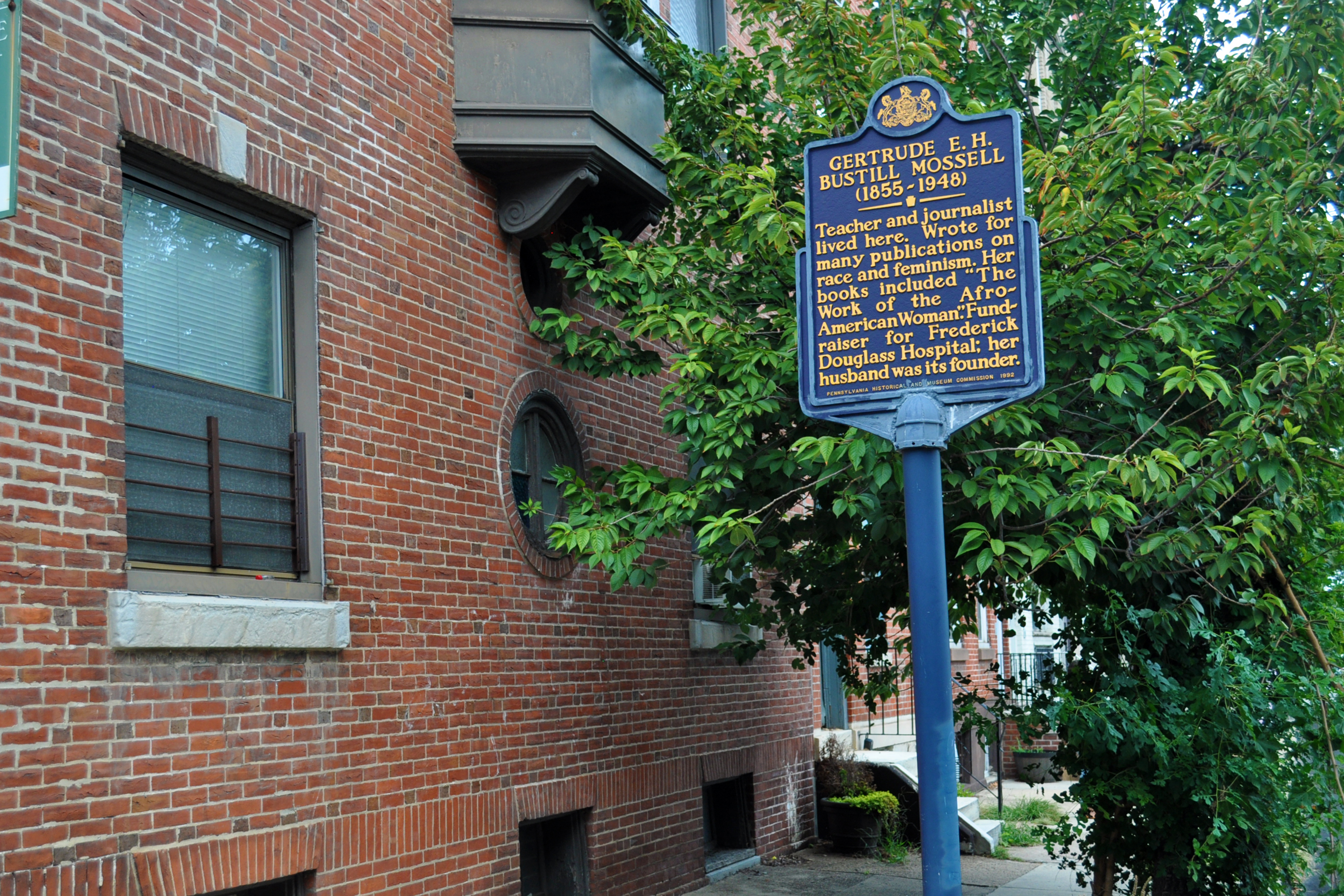
Gertrude E. H. Bustill Mossell Historical Marker at 1423 Lombard St. Philadelphia

After graduating from Robert Vaux Grammar School, Mossell taught school for several years in Philadelphia and Camden, New Jersey. Simultaneously, she began to work as a journalist, serving as a writer and editor for several newspapers and magazines, including the A.M.E. Church Review, the Philadelphia Times, the Philadelphia Echo, the Independent, Woman's Era, and Colored American Magazine. She was editor of the woman's department of the New York Age from 1885 to 1889 and of the Indianapolis World from 1891 to 1892.

In 1880, Mossell married Philadelphia physician, Nathan Francis Mossell. They had two daughters, Florence and Mary. Two additional children died in infancy.

Though she wrote for both black and white publications throughout her career, Mossell's articles often focused on issues particular to black women. Her nationally syndicated column, "Our Woman's Department," offered practical advice on domestic responsibilities and promoted virtues of frugality and pragmatism. Each one, many of which ran on the front page, began with the following editor's note: "The aim of this column will be to promote true womanhood, especially that of the African race. All success progress or need of our women will be given prompt mention." Readers were invited to write directly to Mossell at her home address.

Mossell also covered a variety of political and social issues, where she used her platform to advocate for racial equality, particularly in the realm of employment. Repeatedly, she urged greater numbers of black women to enter journalism. She was a vocal supporter of woman's suffrage and denounced the myth that women fighting for the vote would remain unmarried. "Give women more power in the government offices if the desire is for peace and prosperity," she wrote.

Pdf of the 1892 book The Afro American Press and its Editors by Irvine Garland Penn

In 1894, Mossell published The Work of the Afro-American Woman, a collection of eight essays and seventeen poems that recognized the achievements of black women in a range of fields. Regarding her decision to publish the work under her married name, scholar Joanne Braxton offers the following explanation: "By this strategy of public modesty, the author signaled her intention to defend and celebrate black womanhood without disrupting the delicate balance of black male-female relations or challenging masculine authority."

In 1902, Mossell wrote a children's Sunday school book titled Little Dansie's One Day at Sabbath School.

Gertrude Bustill Mossell was also engaged in civic work, leading the fundraising drive for the Frederick Douglass Memorial Hospital and Training School, which opened in 1895. She raised $30,000, and went on to serve as president of its Social Service Auxiliary. Her other civic activities included organizing the Philadelphia branch of the National Afro-American Council.

== Death ==
Mossell died on January 21, 1948, at the age of 92, in Philadelphia, Pennsylvania.

== See also ==
- Bustill family
