= Mary Ella Mossell =

AME missionary in Haiti

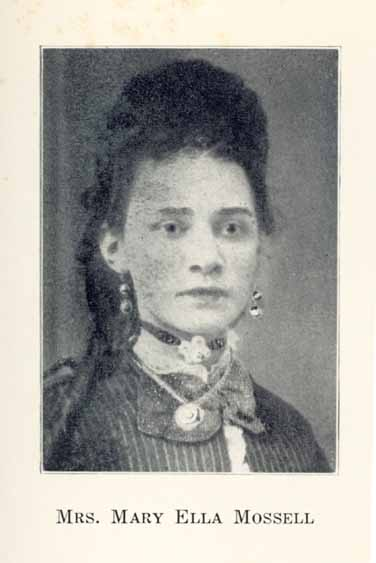
- Born: May 22, 1853
- Died: June 29, 1886 (aged 33)

Mary Ella Forrester Mossell (May 22, 1853 – June 29, 1886) was an American African Methodist Episcopal missionary in Haiti.

== Early life ==
Mary Ella Forrester was born on May 22, 1853, in Baltimore, Maryland. She was the daughter of free blacks: Perry Forrester, a businessman, and Matilda Higgins, who were married on 10 June 1852 in Baltimore by the Rev. William Jones. From 1867 to 1871, she attended the Baltimore Normal School for Colored Teachers. She also learned German, Greek, Latin, singing, piano, and music theory.

On October 26, 1874, she married Charles W. Mossell, an African Methodist Episcopal minister and brother of Aaron Albert Mossell and Nathan Francis Mossell. She accompanied him to pastoral assignments in Georgetown, South Carolina, and Columbia, South Carolina, where she taught public school and ran the church's Sunday school.

The Woman's Parent Mite Missionary Society (WPMMS), as part the AME Church's refocusing on missionary work following the American Civil War, funded a mission trip to Haiti for the Mossells. Mary Mossell prepared by learning French, Haitian Creole, and Spanish. In April 1877, they arrived in Haiti aboard the SS Alps.

Initially, the Rev. Mossell preached at St. Peter's Haytian Union Methodist Episcopal Church, but the next year he set up his own church, St. Paul's AME. Mary Mossell's efforts were integral in the success of the mission. She taught Sunday school, opened a day school, formed a Christian Musical Association which performed concerts, sang French translations of religious songs, and held a concert to raise funds to send five converts (including future AME Bishop John Hurst (1863-1930)) to study for the ministry at Wilberforce University. Her musical and linguistic talents allowed her do outreach to the Haitian elite, including composing original works in French and Creole that have, unfortunately, mostly been lost. They included "La grande marche" (dedicated to Haitian President Lysius Salomon) and "Le boquet" (dedicated to General François Denys Légitime).

Tragedy also struck the mission repeatedly. The Mossell family was all struck with yellow fever, which killed Rev. Mossell's sister Alveretta Mossell. Mossell nursed her daughter Mary through smallpox. In September 1883, the Bazelais Revolution engulfed Port-au-Prince. Armed men - accounts differ as to whether they were rebels or government soldiers - killed many people taking refuge with the Mossell's, set fire to their home, and dragged off Rev. Mossell. Somehow, a pregnant Mary Mossell was able to prevent them from killing her husband, and with assistance reached the American consulate. Mossell gave premature birth to a daughter who died eleven months later, and her other daughter was missing for four days.

The Mossells returned to Baltimore in May 1885. Mary Mossell's health was poor since she gave birth, and she died in Baltimore on June 29, 1886. She is interred in Laurel Cemetery.
