= Indianapolis World =

African American Newspaper

The Indianapolis World, originally the Indianapolis Colored World, was a newspaper in Indianapolis, Indiana. The Library of Congress has an edition of the paper. Several universities also have issues of it in their archives.

== History ==
It debuted as the Indianapolis Colored World in 1884, during the era when the Indianapolis Leader (established in 1879) and Indianapolis Freeman, (established in 1884) were also being published for the African American community. Edward C. Cooper published the illustrated editions of the Freeman beginning in 1888.

Gertrude Bustill Mossell worked at the paper in 1891 and 1892. John C. Baskett edited the paper.
