= Robert Pelham Jr. =

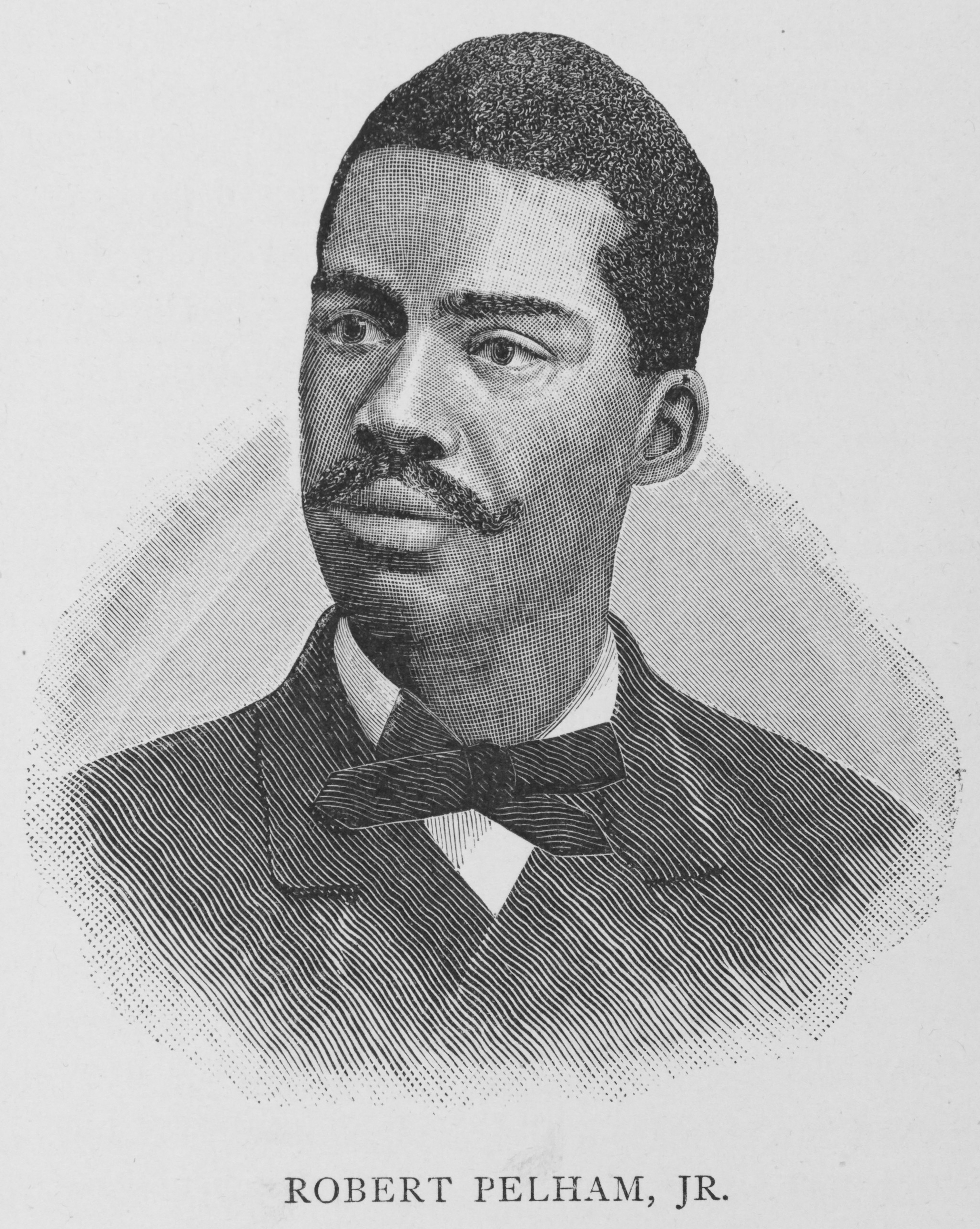
- Pelham in 1887
- Born: January 4, 1859; Petersburg, Virginia
- Died: May 12, 1943 (aged 84); Washington, D.C.
- Education: Howard University
- Occupations: Journalist, civil servant
- Political party: Republican
- Children: 4, including Dorothy and Sara
- Relatives: Frederick B. Pelham (brother); Benjamin Pelham (brother), Meta E. Pelham (sister)

Robert A. Pelham Jr. (January 4, 1859 – June 12, 1943) was a journalist and civil servant in Detroit, Michigan and Washington, D.C. Along with his brother, Benjamin, and others, he was a founder and editor of the Detroit Plaindealer in 1883. He served in a number of public positions in Michigan, and later worked at the United States Census in Washington, D.C. In Washington, he continued to work as a journalist, and late in his life edited the Washington Tribune, a weekly paper. He was also a member of a number of civil rights organizations, including the National Afro-American League, the American Negro Academy, and the Spingarn Medal Commission.

== Early life and family ==
Robert Pelham Jr. was born in Petersburg, Virginia, on January 4, 1859, the second son of Robert and Frances Pelham, both free African Americans. His parents had seven children, including Benjamin, Robert, Joseph, Frederick, Meta, Emma, and Delia. Benjamin worked with Robert as an editor and owner of the Detroit Plaindealer. Joseph became a school principal. Frederick, who worked as a civil engineer with the Michigan Central Railroad, became known for building strong, long-lasting bridges. Meta became a teacher and worked for the Plaindealer. Emma married William W. Ferguson and Delia married George A. Barrier. Pelham, Sr. died in 1904. The year of his birth, Pelham and his family moved north so that the children could be educated. They settled in Detroit, Michigan, in 1868, where Pelham attended the public school taught by Fannie Richards. In 1871, the schools were integrated, and Pelham graduated from high school in 1877. His education included three years at what later became the State Military Academy at Orchard Lake, Michigan.

== Early journalism career ==
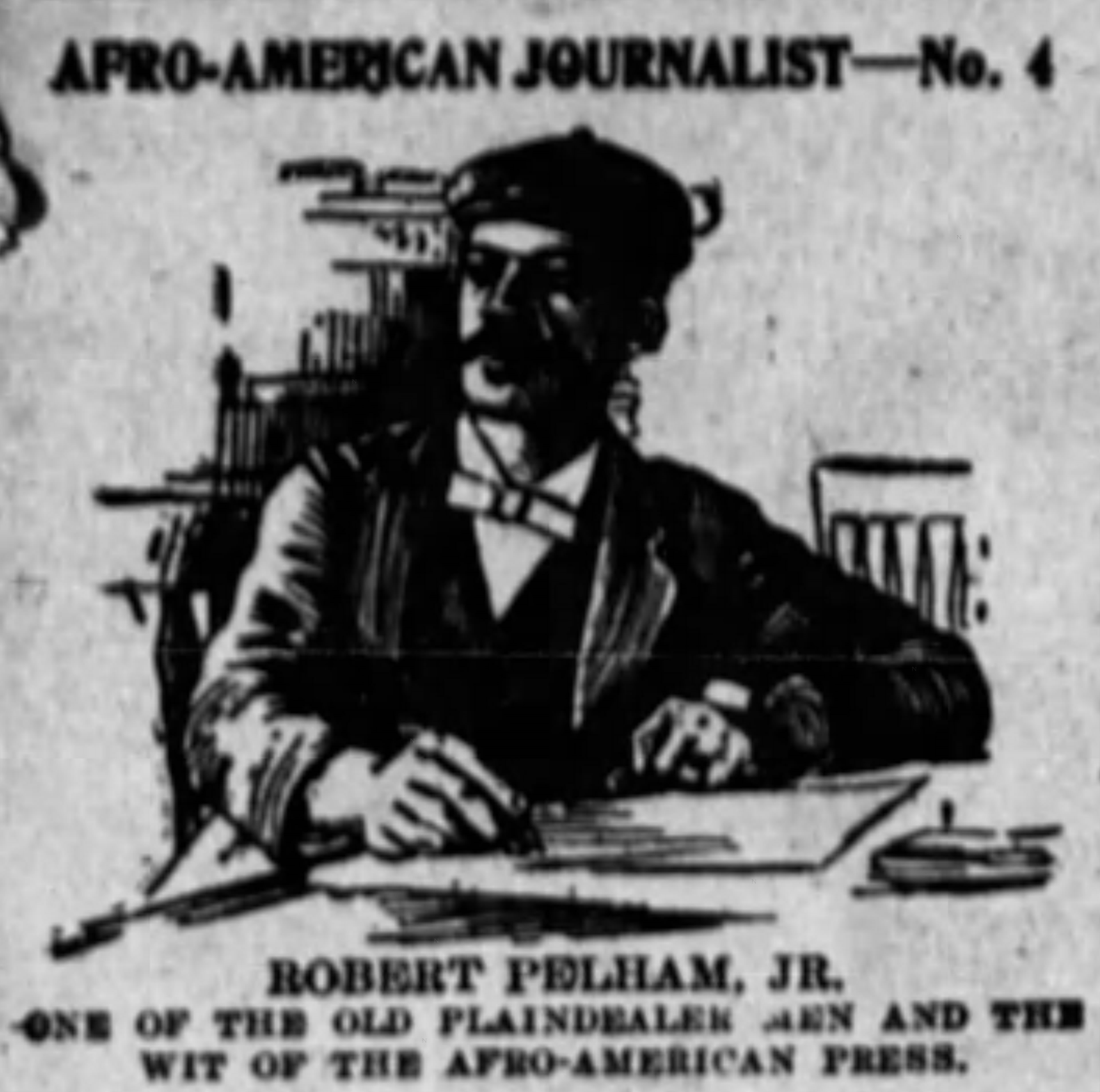
Pelham at his desk at the Plaindealer.

While still a student in 1871, Pelham started working at the Daily Post, later the Detroit Morning Tribune, which was the state's leading Republican newspaper and was owned by Zachariah Chandler. In 1883, Pelham and his brother Benjamin, along with W. H. Anderson and W. H. Stowers, started the Detroit Plaindealer. The paper ran until 1893. Pelham, in the Plaindealer, lauded the work of Ida B. Wells and supported calls for the organization of blacks throughout the country for the purposes of civil rights. Pelham worked with D. Augustus Straker to create branches of the National Afro-American League in Michigan in the 1890s and the pair were active, in part through the league, in supporting blacks in legal trouble. Pelham was an important figure in the league at a national level.

== Civil service career ==
He was successful politically and made numerous public appointments. From 1887 until 1892, he served as a deputy oil inspector for the state of Michigan and from 1893 to 1898 he was an inspector for the Detroit Water Department. In 1892 and 1899, he was a special agent for the United States General Land Office, and in 1900 he was working at the Bureau of Indian Affairs. He was a sergeant-at-arms at the 1896 Republican National Convention.

About 1900, Pelham moved to Washington, D.C., to work for the federal government, spending 37 years at the United States Census Bureau. He also attended night school at Howard University and received a law degree in 1904. Pelham was very successful at the Bureau, and in 1902 he was noted for the speed and accuracy of his work. He invented and patented a pasting apparatus in 1905 and engineered a tallying machine in 1913. At his retirement he was the head of a division of special statistics.

In March 1909, Pelham saw a white police officer beating a black woman he was arresting. When Pelham gathered names of witnesses, the officer arrested him as well. Pelham was represented in court by Republican Senator William Alden Smith and was acquitted. In 1919, Pelham was elected to the American Negro Academy. This exclusive organization was the earliest major African American learned society. It brought together scholars, activists, and editors to refute racist scholarship, promote black claims to individual, social, and political equality, and publish the history and sociology of African American life. His election was opposed by Jesse Moorland but supported by John Wesley Cromwell and Arthur Schomburg, and Pelham soon replaced Cromwell as corresponding secretary of the group, a position he held until his death.

After he retired, Pelham edited and published the weekly paper, Washington Tribune, from 1939 to 1941 and was founder of the Capital News Services, Inc. From 1940-1942 he was a member of the Spingarn Medal Commission.

== Family and death ==
In 1893, Pelham married musician Gabriell Lewis and the couple moved to Washington, D.C. They had four children: Dorothy Pelham Beckley, Sara Pelham Speaks, Robert B., and Fred. Robert Pelham died on June 12, 1943, and his funeral was held at Metropolitan AME Church. He was buried in Columbian Harmony Cemetery.

== Sources ==
- Alexander, Shawn Leigh. An Army of Lions: The Civil Rights Struggle Before the NAACP. University of Pennsylvania Press, 2011
- Moss, Alfred A. The American Negro Academy: Voice of the Talented Tenth. Louisiana State University Press, 1981.
