= Shining Stars =

Shining Stars may refer to:

- The Shining Stars (professional wrestling), Primo and Epico, a professional wrestling tag team
- Shining Stars: The Official Story Of Earth, Wind & Fire, a 2001 biographical film about the American band Earth, Wind & Fire
- Shining Stars, a marketing program affiliated with Kid Brands

== See also ==
- Shining Star (disambiguation)
