= Robert Douglass Jr. =

African-American artist and activist (1809–1887)

- Born: 1809; Philadelphia, Pennsylvania, U.S.
- Died: October 26, 1887 (aged 77–78)
- Education: Pennsylvania Academy of the Fine Arts; Royal Academy of Arts; student of Thomas Sully
- Mother: Grace Bustill Douglass
- Relatives: Bustill family

Robert Douglass Jr. (1809 – October 26, 1887) was an African-American artist and leading activist from Philadelphia.

== Biography ==
Born in Philadelphia, Pennsylvania, in 1809, Robert Douglass Jr. was the son of the abolitionist and community leaders Robert Douglass Sr., from the Caribbean island of St Kitts, and Grace Bustill Douglass, daughter of Cyrus Bustill. His sister was artist and abolitionist Sarah Mapps Douglass; he also had four other siblings.

Douglass Jr. took a leading role in the National Colored Conventions and served as a secretary at the 1855 Convention.

He trained at Pennsylvania Academy of Fine Arts, which rarely admitted black students, and also trained at the Royal Academy of Arts while he was visiting London. A student of Thomas Sully, he went on to mentor his own cousin and fellow artist, David Bustill Bowser.

Douglass taught at the Institute for Colored Youth. An article from 1890 recognised him as a "portrait painter of some merit". He also painted landscapes and is considered Philadelphia's first African-American photographer. Notable works include portraits of abolitionists including William Lloyd Garrison and James Forten in 1834. His commercial business consisted of sign painting and interior decoration. Little of his work survives.

Douglass emigrated to Haiti in 1824, with the support of the Haitian Emigration Society of Philadelphia, an organization created by Richard Allen and Forten. Douglass also migrated to Jamaica in the late 1840s but later returned to Philadelphia.

== See also ==
- African-American upper class
