= Grace Douglass =

Grace Bustill Douglass (c. 1782 – March 9, 1842) was an African-American abolitionist and women's rights advocate. Her family was one of the first prominent free black families in the United States. Her family's history is one of the best documented for a black family during this period, dating from 1732 until 1925.

== Life and career ==
Grace Bustill Douglass was born in Burlington, New Jersey, to the Bustill family, a well-known abolitionist family. Her father was Cyrus Bustill, a strong leader in the community and promoter of the abolishment of slavery. Her mother was Elizabeth Morey, who was half Delaware Indian and half English. Douglass was one of eight children; she had three brothers and four sisters. Cyrus Bustill was manumitted before he got married from his Quaker owner, Thomas Prior, in 1769. From Prior, he learned the art of bread-making and eventually he opened his own bakery in New Jersey. His bakery was successful, which allowed him to provide well for his family. Later he moved to Philadelphia, where he opened up another bakery at 56 Arch Street and where he met and married Elizabeth. He was a founder of Philadelphia's Free African Society. In 1797, he opened up a school for African-American children. Growing up in Philadelphia allowed Douglass and her siblings to attend one of the few schools for black children during her time. She was also able to learn a trade, millinery, and she subsequently opened up a milliner shop on Arch Street next to her father's bakery.

In 1803, at the age of 21, Douglass married Robert Douglass, a wealthy barber from St Kitts in the West Indies, and they had six children together. Not much is known of four of her children, but Sarah and Robert Jr. are well documented. Elizabeth was their eldest daughter; she died young after attending a private school for a few years, being forced to leave the school because parents of the white students complained. This led Douglass, along with family friend James Forten, to open up a school of their own. This school, along with private tutors, was where Sarah, Robert, and their other siblings all received their extensive educations. Sarah went on to become a famous abolitionist and teacher like her mother, and Robert was a well-known portrait painter.

Following in her family's footsteps, Douglass also became a devout Quaker. She attended meetings of the Society of Friends at the predominantly white meeting house on Arch Street. Although she was a devout Friend, she was never allowed membership of the Society of Friends because she was black. During this time, most Quakers were strong abolitionists, but many still followed segregationist customs. Her meeting house followed these customs, separating whites and blacks into separate sections. For this reason, all of Douglass's children, except Sarah, left the Friends and joined their father at the First African Presbyterian Church.

== Anti-slavery activities ==
It was from her life of privilege that Douglass decided to dedicate her life to helping less fortunate people. Douglass and her daughter Sarah met and developed a close friendship with Lucretia Mott and the Grimké sisters, Angelina and Sarah. This friendship eventually led them to create the Philadelphia Female Anti-Slavery Society after they were not permitted to become members of the Anti-Slavery Society in Philadelphia because they were women. The society was involved in different social issues and the abolitionist movement. They fought against slavery and racial and gender discrimination. The society's constitution was signed in December 1833 by 18 women, including Douglass. The society raised money, spread antislavery texts, and started antislavery petitions in Washington D.C. The society also supported the then radical idea that women should be allowed to vote, speak in public, and become leaders. Another cause that was important to the society was education. Due in large part to Grace and Sarah Douglass' dedication to educating African-American children, the society formed an education committee, which looked after educational facilities for black children around the Philadelphia area. After the Thirteenth and Fifteenth Amendments were ratified in 1865 and 1870, respectively, the society was dissolved by the members, since they believed that their goal of ending slavery had been achieved.

Douglass was also involved in other abolitionist activities. She was a member of the Anti-Slavery Convention of American Women, an annual meeting of antislavery societies in the free states. In 1837 and 1839, Douglass was elected as vice president for the conventions held in New York. Although Douglass was a Quaker, she was also a delegate at the annual meeting in Philadelphia for the Second African Presbyterian Church, with her husband and her sister, Mary Bustill. The members of this church thought that equality between the sexes was morally right, and they welcomed women into the organization.

== Notable relatives ==
- Grace Bustill Douglass is the great grandaunt of actor, singer, and political activist Paul Bustill Robeson.

== See also ==
- Bustill family
