= Sarah Mapps Douglass =

American activist and artist (1806–1882)

- Born: September 9, 1806; Philadelphia, Pennsylvania, U.S.
- Died: September 8, 1882 (aged 75); Philadelphia, Pennsylvania, U.S.
- Resting place: Eden Cemetery, Collingdale, Pennsylvania, U.S.
- Known for: Writing; paintings
- Spouse: William Douglass
- Parent(s): Robert Douglass; Grace Bustill
- Relatives: Bustill family

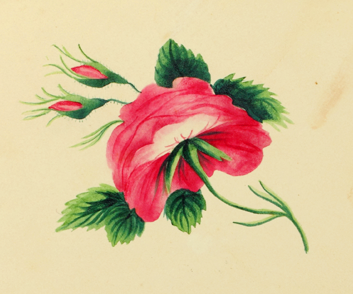
A flower by Sarah Mapps Douglass, c.1833

Sarah Mapps Douglass (September 9, 1806 – September 8, 1882) was an American educator, abolitionist, writer, and public lecturer. Her painted images on her written letters may be the first or earliest surviving examples of signed paintings by an African American woman. These paintings are contained within the Cassey Dickerson Album, a rare collection of 19th-century friendship letters between a group of women.

Although she never became a doctor, Douglass was the first African American student at the Female Medical College of Pennsylvania.. She was also a founding member of the Female Literary Association and the Philadelphia Female Anti-Slavery Society.

== Early life and family ==
Sarah Douglass was born in Philadelphia, Pennsylvania, to a prominent abolitionist family, the only daughter of abolitionists Robert Douglass, a baker, and Grace Bustill Douglass, a milliner and teacher. Douglass' grandfather, Cyrus Bustill, a Quaker who owned a bakery and operated a school run from his home, was an early member of the Free African Society. Douglass grew up among Philadelphia's elite, and according to C. Peter Ripley "[s]he received extensive [private] tutoring as a child."

She is part of the Bustill family in Philadelphia. Her brother was artist Robert Douglass Jr., with whom she shared advertising space at his shop on Arch Street, where their family lived. Her cousin was artist David Bustill Bowser.

== Education and career ==
=== Teaching ===
In the early 1820s, Douglass attended college, and then taught briefly in New York City. In 1825, she began teaching in Philadelphia at a school organized by her mother with James Forten, a wealthy African American sailmaker, which she had also attended as child. Starting in 1833, she taught briefly at the Free African School for Girls, before establishing her own school for African American girls. She was soon recognized as a talented teacher of the sciences and arts, and for holding her students to high standards. In 1838, the Philadelphia Female Anti-Slavery Society took over the school, retaining Douglass as the headmaster. In 1854, the school merged with the Institute for Colored Youth (now Cheyney State University) on Lombard Street, and Douglass become the head of the primary department, a position she held until her retirement in 1877. As a teacher, she was committed to giving girls equal opportunities to learn subjects which had previously been reserved primarily for boys, including mathematics and sciences. She was interested in various sciences herself, and kept her personal natural history cabinet in her classroom, which included a collection of various shells and minerals for her students to study.

Douglass's role as an activist began as early as 1831, when at twenty-five, she organized the collection of money to send to William Lloyd Garrison to support The Liberator, which she also served as a contributor to.

=== Female Literary Association ===
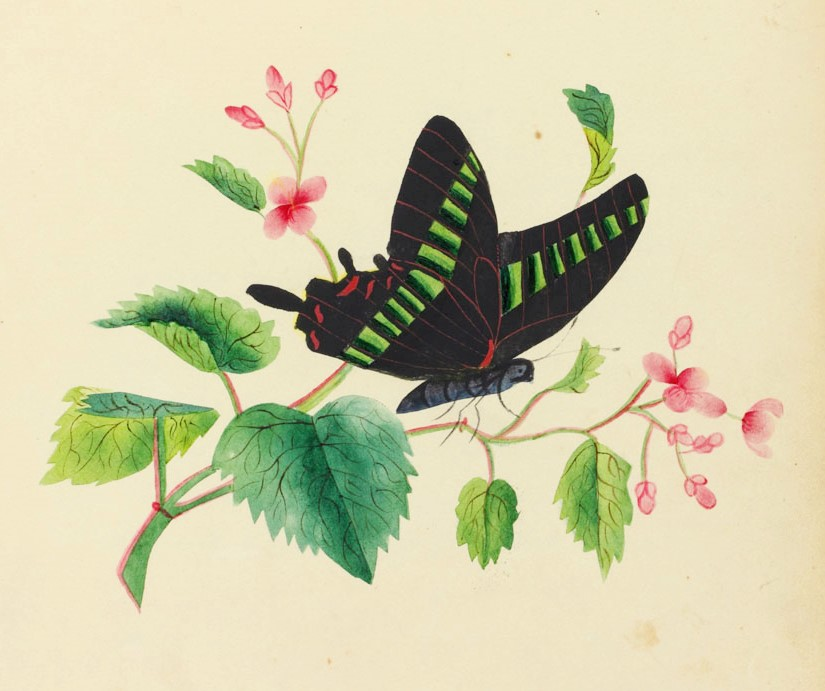
Another watercolor by Douglass

Douglass also helped found the Female Literary Association (FLA) in 1831, a group of free African American women dedicated to improving their skills and deepening their identification with enslaved black women. Black literary societies like this one began forming in urban Northern cities in the late 1820s and early 1830s. These societies turned to reading as an invaluable method of acquiring knowledge and to writing as a means of asserting identity, recording information, and communicating with a black public that ranged from the literate to the semi-literate to the illiterate. Societies were based on the idea that for the welfare and survival of the community, individuals had to come together in larger groups that would both create a sense of national identity and collective spirit and would extend essential knowledge to the black community, both free and enslaved.

Douglass was one of the FLA's leaders, and the FLA was the first social libraries specially for African American women. The FLA provided a space for Black women to share important readings they found as well as their own writings. The Female Literary Association encouraged self-improvement through education for both the literate and illiterate and to both the free and enslaved. Education was to challenge white beliefs in the intellectual inferiority of African Americans. Douglass and the women of the Association believed that the "cultivation of intellectual powers" was the greatest human pursuit, because God had bestowed those powers and talents. It was their duty as women and African Americans to use those talents to try to break down the existing divides between African Americans and Whites, and to fight for equal rights for people of color.

The members of the Female Literary Association met every Tuesday with meetings devoted to reading and recitation for the purpose of "mutual improvement in moral and literary pursuits." According to their supporter William Lloyd Garrison, nearly all of the members would weekly write original pieces, put anonymously into a box, that a committee afterwards criticized. Douglass herself often wrote prose and poetry, much of it published in "Ladies' Department" of The Liberator, The Colored American, and the Anglo-African Magazine under the pseudonym Zillah and possibly also "Sophonisba."

In an address to the Association in 1832 at a "mental feast," Douglass shared how the call to activism with the Female Literary Association came about:

One short year ago, how different were my feelings on the subject of slavery! It is true, the wail of the captive sometimes came to my ear in the midst of my happiness, and caused my heart to bleed for his wrongs; but, alas! the impression was as evanescent as the early cloud and morning dew. I had formed a little world of my own, and cared not to move beyond its precincts. But how was the scene changed when I held the oppressor lurking on the border of my peaceful home! I saw his iron hand stretched forth to seize me as his prey, and the cause of the slave became my own. I started up, and with one mighty effort threw from me the lethargy which had covered me as a mantle for years; and determined, by the help of the Almighty, to use every exertion in my power to elevate the character of my wronged and neglected race.

=== Philadelphia Female Anti-Slavery Society ===
With her mother, she was a founding member (1833) of the biracial Philadelphia Female Anti-Slavery Society. The Society, from the beginning, was interracial, including members of African American descent like Douglass along with white women members, like Lucretia Mott. The purpose of the society was to secure the total abolition of slavery as soon as possible, without any compensation to the slaveholders, as well as to procure equal civil and religious rights with the white people of the United States.

On December 14, 1833, the society finalized their Constitution, which stated that they deemed it their duty "as professing Christians to manifest [their] abhorrence of the flagrant injustice and deep sin of slavery by united and vigorous exertions." Membership in the society was open to any woman who subscribed to these views and contributed to the Society.

The members of the Society subscribed to several antislavery journals such as Garrison's The Liberator and The Emancipator to circulate among the members and their friends. The Society also accumulated a small library of antislavery books and pamphlets for dissemination. "Within its first year, it also established a school for African American children. The Society also promoted the boycott of goods manufactured by slaves and lobbied for emancipation. This included circulating petitions to Congress for the abolition of slavery in the District of Columbia and other federal territories and for suppressing the slave trade between the American states." By 1840, Douglass had served in the group as a member of the board of directors, of the committee on annual fairs, of the education committee, recording and corresponding secretary, librarian, and manager.

== Later life and death ==
From 1853 to 1877, Douglass studied anatomy, female health and hygiene, and acquired medical basic training at the Female Medical College of Pennsylvania, becoming the first African American student, and at the Ladies' Institute of Pennsylvania Medical University. She did not receive a medical degree or become a doctor, but her work at the medical institutes influenced her decision to lecture and teach evening classes to African American women at meetings of the Banneker Institute on issues of physiology and hygiene.

In 1855, she married William Douglass (no relation), the African-American rector of African Episcopal Church of St. Thomas and a widower with nine children. After her husband's death in 1862, Douglass resumed her antislavery activities and teaching full-time.

She died in 1882 in Philadelphia and was buried in Eden Cemetery in Collingdale, Pennsylvania in an unmarked grave.

== In popular culture ==
- Sarah Mapps Douglass appears as a main character in Ain Gordon's 2013 play If She Stood, commissioned by the Painted Bride Art Center in Philadelphia.
- A 30-minute theater piece, A Quiet Roar: The Unparalleled Lives of Bayard Rustin & Sarah Mapps Douglass, imagines a 1948 encounter between Douglass and Bayard Rustin. Written by Philadelphia freelancer and comedian Yvie Jones, the play was commissioned by and presented at the Arch Street Friends Meeting House in the spring and summer of 2026.

== See also ==
- List of abolitionists
- List of African-American abolitionists
