= Bustill family =

American family

Bustill
- Current region: Philadelphia
- Origin: Africa; Europe; America
- Founded: 1732
- Founder: Cyrus Bustill
- Connected families: Robeson family Douglass family

The Bustill family is a prominent American family of largely African, European and Lenape Native American descent. The family has included artists, educators, journalists and activists, both against slavery and against Jim Crow.

== History ==
Born in Burlington, New Jersey on February 2, 1732, Cyrus Bustill was a son of the Quaker lawyer Samuel Bustill and Parthenia, a woman of African descent who was held in bondage by him. When Samuel Bustill died in 1742, his legal widow, Grace Bustill, subsequently arranged for the sale of Cyrus Bustill to fellow Quaker Thomas Prior (or "Pryor") with the understanding that Prior would allow Cyrus to train and earn enough money as an apprentice baker in order to purchase his freedom.

Cyrus would go on to either purchase his freedom or receive manumission at an indeterminate date, then become a businessman and landowner in his own right thereafter. At the time of his death in 1806, he was a leading member of the African-American upper class of Philadelphia.

Cyrus and his wife, the mixed race Elizabeth Morey (1746-1827, of Native American and European descent), had eight children. One of them was the abolitionist and feminist advocate Grace Douglass.

Other notable descendants of Cyrus and Elizabeth Morey Bustill include the performer and activist Paul Robeson, the artist David Bustill Bowser, the educator, abolitionist and writer Sarah Mapps Douglass, the journalist and activist Gertrude Bustill Mossell, and the artist and activist Robert Douglass Jr.

== Family tree ==
- Samuel Bustill (d. 1742) m. Parthenia
  - Cyrus Bustill (1732-1806) m. Elizabeth Morey (1746–1827)
    - Grace Douglass (1782 – March 9, 1842) m. Robert Douglass
      - Sarah Mapps Douglass (1806-1882)
      - Elizabeth Douglass
      - Robert Douglass Jr. (1809–1887)
      - three other children
    - David Bustill m. Elizabeth W. Hicks
      - Charles Hicks Bustill (1816–1890) m. Emily Robinson
        - Gertrude Bustill Mossell (1855–1948) m. Nathan Francis Mossell
          - Florence Mossell
          - Mary Mossell Griffin (c. 1885 — after January 1963) m. Joshua R. Griffin Jr.
        - Maria Louisa Bustill m. William Drew Robeson I
          - William Drew Jr. (born 1881)
          - Reeve (born c. 1887)
          - Ben (born c. 1893)
          - Marian (born c. 1895)
          - Paul Robeson (1898–1976) m. Eslanda Goode
            - Paul Robeson Jr. (1927–2014) m. Marilyn Paula Greenberg
              - David (died 1998)
              - Susan Robeson
      - Joseph Cassey Bustill (1822–1895) m. Sarah Humphreys (1829–?)
        - Anna Amelia Bustill (1862–?) m. James Humphery Smith
          - Humphery J. Smith
          - Virginia Bustill Smith (1893–1978) m. Joseph Walter Rhetta
            - Carldon Walter Rhetta m. Wilhelmina Chapman
            - James Curtis Rhetta m. Ruth A. Washington
              - James Curtis Rhetta II m. Emma F. Johnson
                - Mark Rhetta
                  - Zoey Rhetta
                - James C. Rhetta III m. Yolanda Causey
                  - James C. RhettaIV
                  - Jacob C. Rhetta
          - Curtis L. Smith
          - George J. Smith
          - John R. Smith
          - Anna E. Smith
    - Mary Bustill Miller m. John Miller
      - Cyrus Bustill Miller
    - Ruth
    - Rachael Bustill Bowser (1780-1848) m. Jeremiah Bowser (1766–1856)
      - David Bustill Bowser (1820–1900) m. Elizabeth Harriet Stevens Gray (June 13, 1831 – November 29, 1908)
        - Raphael Bowser
        - Ida Elizabeth Bowser Asbury (1870–1955)
    - Leah
    - Charles
    - Cyrus, Jr.

== See also ==
- Quander family
- Syphax family
- Vaughan family
