= The Shining Star (Anderson) =

US newspaper

- Type: Weekly newspaper
- Format: Newspaper
- Owner: Edward G. Irvin
- Founder: Edward G. Irvin
- Founded: 1922
- Ceased publication: 1927
- City: Anderson, Indiana
- OCLC number: 13317294

The Shining Star or Indiana Shining Star was an African American newspaper published in Anderson, Indiana, from 1922 to about 1927. It is the only known African-American newspaper ever published there.

The newspaper was founded in 1922 by Edward Giles Irvin (1893–1982), the youngest of the ten founding members of the Kappa Alpha Psi fraternity. Irvin had worked for newspapers in various cities before joining the military in World War I. They included the Indianapolis Freeman, Chicago Daily Bulletin, and Gary Sun. Irvin is memorialized in the name of the charitable arm of the Chicago alumni chapter of Kappa Alpha Psi and in the name of an annual Kappa Alpha Psi award.

Like many early Black papers, The Shining Star placed a strong emphasis on self-improvement, publishing a new word and Bible quotation every week for its readers to memorize. The local news in The Shining Star was dominated by the activities of churches and the Grand United Order of Odd Fellows, of which Irvin was a member. The Shining Star exhorted its readers to support local Anderson businesses and lift up the local community. Its coverage, however, was not limited to Anderson, as it provided a weekly column about nearby Muncie as well.

== See also ==
- List of African-American newspapers in Indiana

== Works cited ==
- Bigham, Darrel E. (1996). "The Black Press in Indiana, 1879-1985". In Suggs, Henry Lewis (ed.). The Black Press in the Middle West, 1865-1985. Greenwood Press. ISBN 9780313255793.
- Jennings, Michael E. (2008). "The Pride of All Our Hearts:The Founders of Kappa Alpha Psi Fraternity". In Parks, Gregory S. (ed.). Black Greek-Letter Organizations in the Twenty-First Century: Our Fight Has Just Begun (1st ed.). Lexington, Kentucky: The University Press of Kentucky. p. 119. ISBN 978-0-8131-2491-9. LCCN 2007052578 – via Google Books.
