= Detroit Plaindealer =

American newspaper (1883–1894)

Coordinates: 42.332328°N 83.050598°W

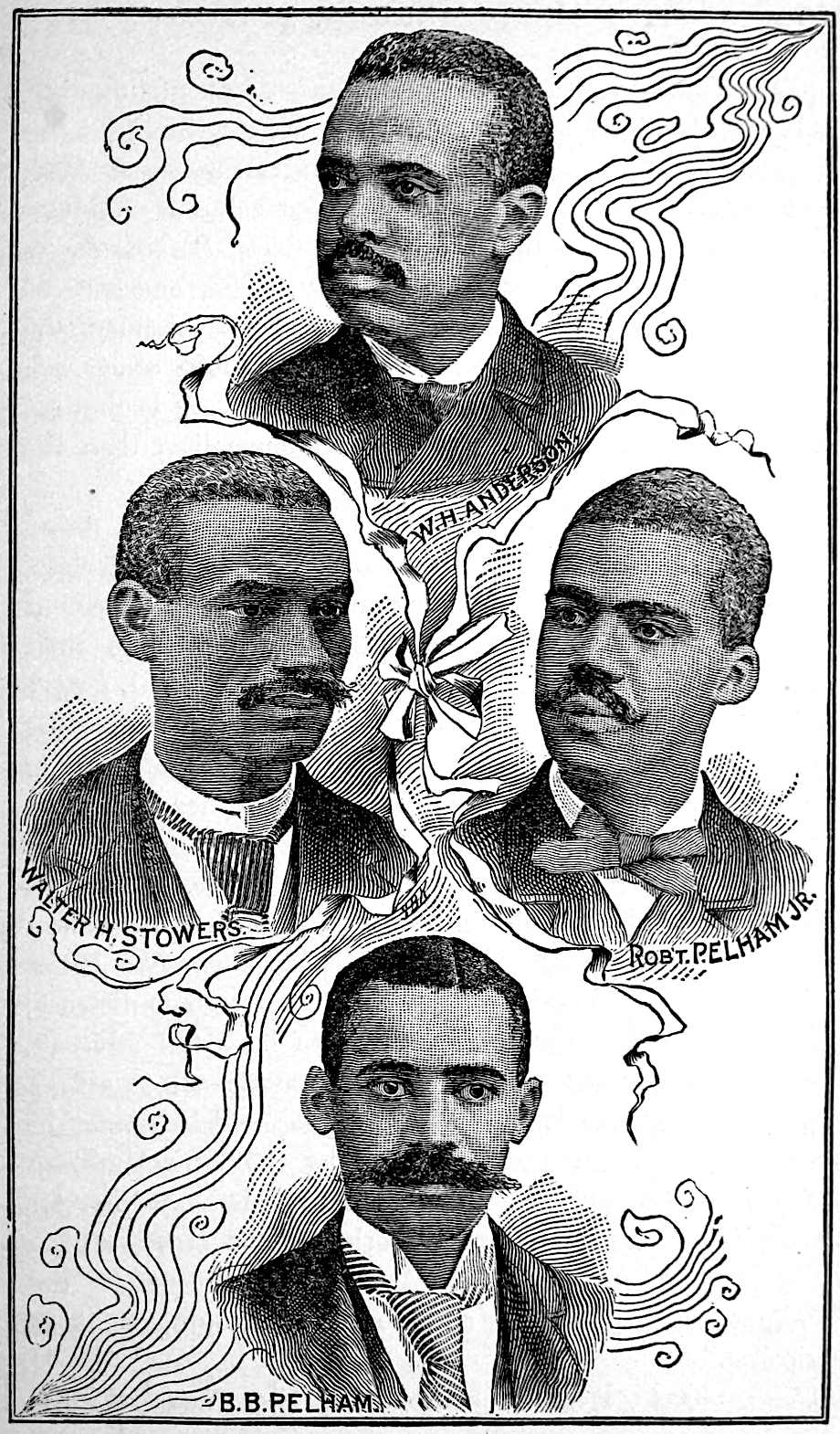
- Detroit Plaindealer newspaper founders
- Format: broadsheet
- Founder(s): Benjamin Pelham, Robert Pelham Jr., Walter H. Stowers, William H. Anderson
- Staff writers: Meta E. Pelham
- Active dates: 1883–1894
- Headquarters: Detroit, Michigan, U.S.
- OCLC number: 9975654

Detroit Plaindealer (1883–1894) also known as simply The Plaindealer, was an American newspaper that served the Black community and was published in Detroit. Since 2020, the former newspaper publishing building has a historical marker at 1114 Washington Boulevard in the Capitol Park district in Detroit.

== History ==
The newspaper was founded by brothers Benjamin Pelham and Robert Pelham Jr., Walter H. Stowers, and William H. Anderson; and was advertised as "Detroit’s first Afro-American newspaper". Its news reporting included abolitionist activities. It served the African American communities throughout the midwest. It opened doors for expanding and connecting African American businesspeople, politicians, government service workers and civil rights leaders within the Detroit community. Meta E. Pelham worked as a reporter for the newspaper. In 1892, the newspaper was published in both Detroit and in Cincinnati, Ohio.

The Detroit Plaindealer closed in 1894 after financial struggles. The Afro-American Press and Its Editors (1891) book includes a profile on the newspaper and its employees.

== See also ==
- List of African-American newspapers in Michigan
