= Charles Hicks Bustill =

American abolitionist

- Born: c.1815
- Died: 1890
- Occupations: Abolitionist conductor
- Family: Bustill

Charles Hicks Bustill (c.1815–1890) was an African-American abolitionist and conductor in the Underground Railroad in Philadelphia before the American Civil War. He made a living as a plasterer.

Bustill's grandfather was Cyrus Bustill and he was a member of the city's prominent Bustill family. His children include Gertrude Bustill Mossell and Maria Louisa Bustill, mother of Paul Robeson.
