= Indianapolis Leader =

Defunct African American newspaper in Indiana (1879–1891)

- “An Equal Chance and Fair Play”
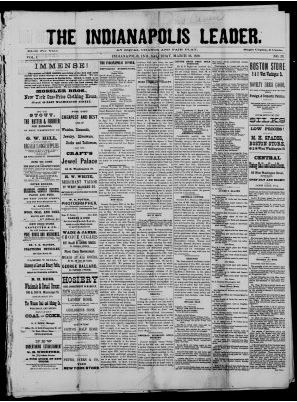
- Type: Weekly newspaper
- Format: Broadsheet
- Publisher: Bagby & Co.
- Founded: August 30, 1879
- Ceased publication: 1891
- Headquarters: Indianapolis, Indiana
- Country: United States
- Circulation: 3,000

The Indianapolis Leader began in August 1879 as Indianapolis' first black newspaper.

Before the Civil War, no African American newspaper existed in Indiana. In 1870, during Reconstruction, there were only ten such newspapers nationwide. However, by 1880 there were thirty. The Leader, along with the Indianapolis Freeman, was one of those.

== History ==
Born in 1847, Robert Bagby was the son of former slaves. His father purchased his freedom and his former master, a tanner, taught him his trade and later partnered with him in his business.

In 1857, Bagby's father took his wife, and six sons, and relocated to the ex-slave community of Oxford, Ohio.

After graduating from Oberlin College, Robert relocated to Indianapolis, in the early 1870s, where he began principal of the all-black school, Public School 17. Shortly after he arrived, his brothers, Benjamin D. Bagby and James D. Bagby, followed his lead. They, too, moved to Indianapolis and became principals of all-black schools.

Although they were primarily educators, The Bagby Brothers decided to start a four-page weekly newspaper in 1879 – the Indianapolis Leader. It became the first black newspaper in Indianapolis.

James, the youngest Bagby Brother, served as business manager, while Benjamin and Robert contributed articles and editorials.

The brothers had established a devout connection with the Republican Party and, due to these connections, the newspaper thrived and the "Bagby" named became synonymous with "success."

== Content ==
The Leader carried society news for Indianapolis's African-American community and was vocal in encouraging blacks to migrate north from the south.

The Bagby Brothers positioned the newspaper as such:

"Let every colored man who favors the elevation of his race subscribe for the Leader; and let every white man who believes that slavery was a crime against humanity and that it is the duty of the ruling race to aid the Negro in his struggle for moral, social and intellectual elevation do likewise."

== Selling of newspaper ==
The Bagbys’ sold The Leader in 1885, with Robert Bagby opting to use his goodwill to go into politics and law. He became the first African American to serve on City Council, who went on to run a successful law practice.

The Leader re-emerged in 1886, with editor, Edward Hutchins, rebranding it as a white, four-page weekly, affiliated with the Greenback Party.

Two farmers, Andrew J. Johnson and Lewis H. Johnson, acquired The Leader the following year, and Thomas J. Sharp took over as editor and publisher in 1888. Sharp rebranded The Leader as “The great Union Labor paper of Indiana...chiefly among farmers and the laboring people.” Sharp reported a circulation of 3,200 in 1888, but two years later the figure fell by over 25 percent.

Sharp sold The Leader to John Medert in 1890. However, Sharp returned as editor in 1891, but the newspaper ceased publication later that year.
