= Cyrus Bustill =

American brewer, baker, abolitionist and leader (1732-1806)

Cyrus Bustil
- Born: February 2, 1732; Springfield, New Jersey, U.S.
- Died: 1806 (aged 73–74); Philadelphia, Pennsylvania, U.S.
- Resting place: Eden Cemetery, Collingdale, Pennsylvania, U.S.
- Occupation: Brewer
- Known for: Abolitionist work in the United States
- Notable work: Founding member of the Free African Society in Philadelphia
- Relatives: Bustill family

Cyrus Bustill (February 2, 1732 – 1806) was an African American brewer and baker, abolitionist and community leader.

A notable business owner in the African American community in Philadelphia, he also became a founding member of the Free African Society in the city.

== Background ==
Born in Burlington, New Jersey, on February 2, 1732, Cyrus Bustill was the son of Quaker lawyer Samuel Bustill and Parthenia, a woman of African descent whom Samuel enslaved. After Samuel Bustill died in 1742, his widow, Grace Bustill, arranged for the sale of Cyrus Bustill to fellow Quaker Thomas Prior (or "Pryor") with the understanding that Prior would allow Cyrus to train and earn enough money as an apprentice baker to purchase his freedom.

While some sources indicate that Cyrus Bustill used his apprenticeship wages to purchase his freedom in 1774, others state that Prior liberated Cyrus by manumission in 1769, which would have likely made Cyrus one of the 104 enslaved Africans described in records of the Burlington Quarterly Meeting of Friends as having been freed by Quakers between 1763 and 1796.

By 1791, Cyrus Bustill was recorded as owning twelve acres in the black settlement of Guineatown between the Abington and Cheltenham townships in Montgomery County, Pennsylvania. He married Elizabeth Morey (1746–1827), a woman of Native American and European descent. Their children include Grace Douglass, David Bowser Bustill, and Mary Bustill.

Considered the founder of the prominent Bustill family, his descendants include Paul Robeson (1898–1976), David Bustill Bowser (1820–1900) Sarah Mapps Douglass (1806–1882), Robert Douglass Jr. (1809–1887) and Gertrude Bustill Mossell (1855–1948).

Cyrus Bustill died in 1806. His grave is located at the Eden Cemetery in Collingdale, Pennsylvania.
