= Benjamin Pelham =

American politician

Benjamin Burnside Pelham
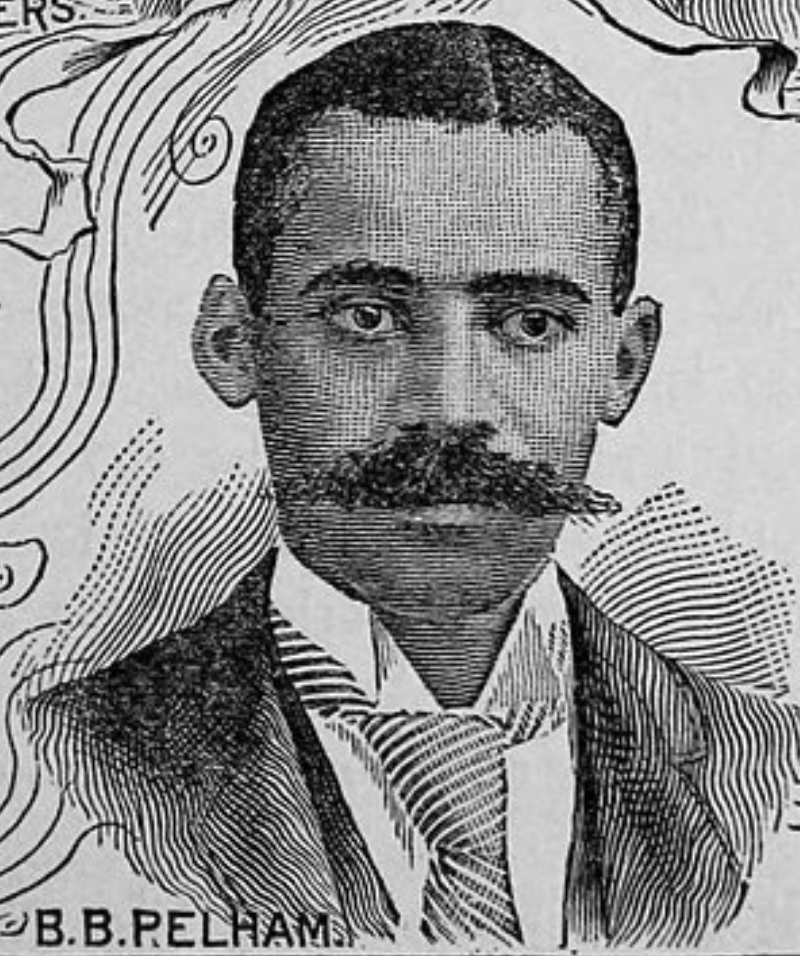
- Born: February 7, 1862; Detroit, Michigan, U.S.
- Died: 1948 (aged 85–86)
- Other names: B.B. Pelham, Benj. B. Pelham, Ben Pelham
- Occupations: Lawyer, accountant, political organizer, journalist, newspaper publisher
- Relatives: Robert Pelham Jr. (brother), Frederick B. Pelham (brother); Meta E. Pelham (sister)

Benjamin Burnside Pelham (1862–1948) was an American lawyer, accountant, political organizer, journalist, and newspaper publisher.

== Biography ==
Benjamin Burnside Pelham was born on February 7, 1862, in Detroit, Michigan. He attended Everett School in Detroit, followed by Detroit High School.

He was a journalist and edited the newspapers The Venture and Detroit Plaindealer. He served as president of the county's Board of Supervisors and was one of the most powerful African American politicians in the United States during the early 1900s. Aris A. Mallas wrote Forty Years in Politics - The Story of Ben Pelham (Wayne State University Press, 1957) about him.
