= Aaron Albert Mossell =

American lawyer (1863–1951)

Aaron Albert Mossell II
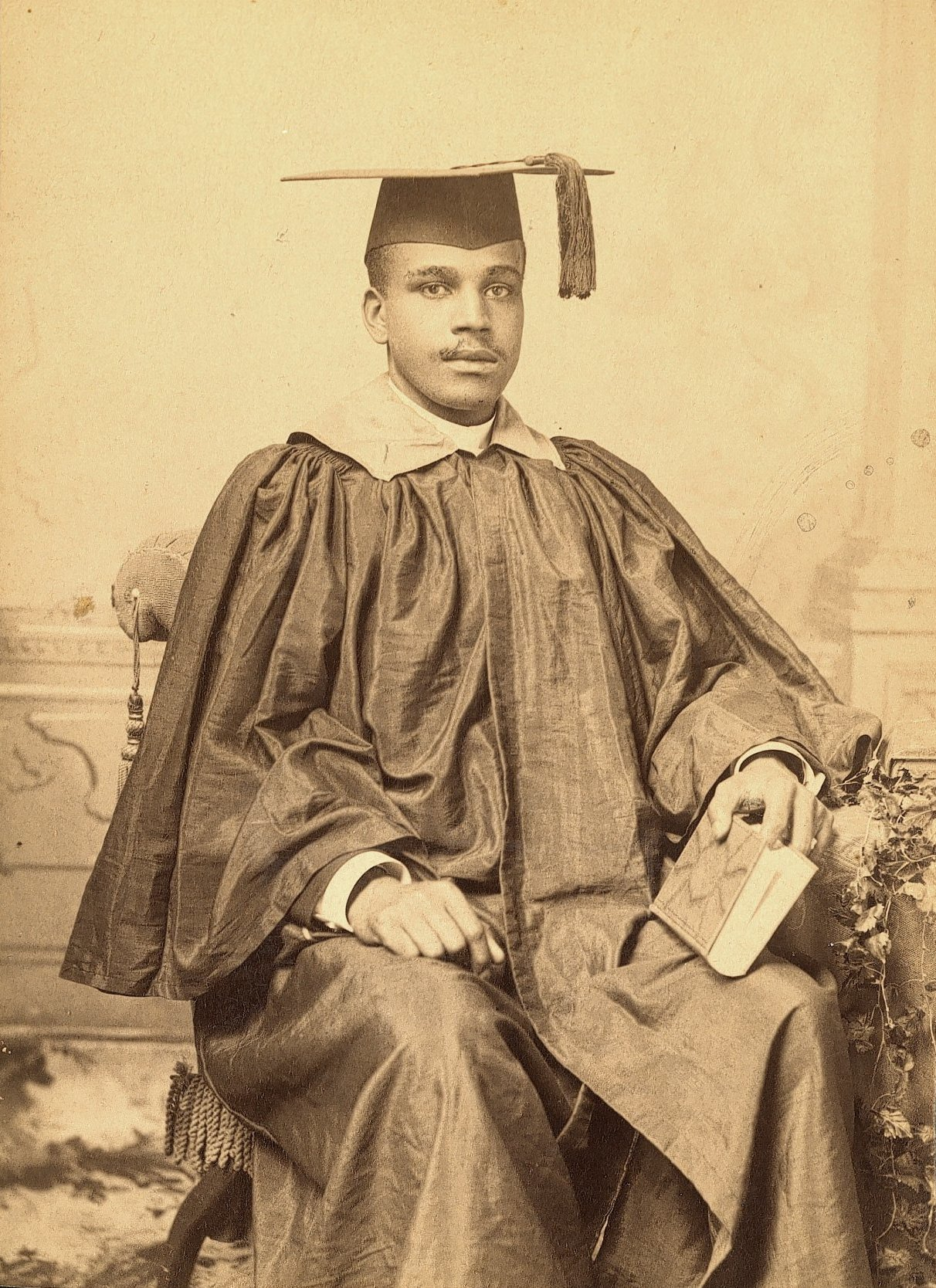
- Mossell in 1888
- Born: November 3, 1863; Hamilton, Province of Canada
- Died: February 1, 1951 (aged 87); Cardiff, Wales
- Education: Lincoln University; University of Pennsylvania Law School
- Spouse: Mary Louisa Tanner
- Children: 3
- Parent(s): Aaron Albert Mossell I Eliza Bowers

Aaron Albert Mossell II (November 3, 1863 – February 1, 1951) was a Canadian-African-American lawyer - the first African-American to graduate from the University of Pennsylvania Law School.

== Biography ==
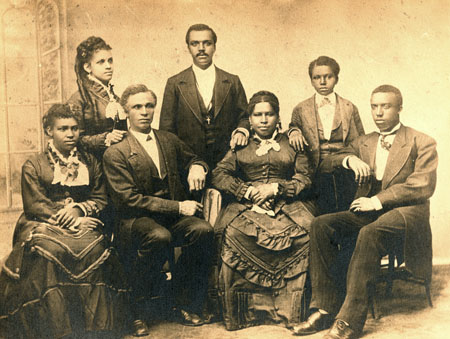
Mossell's parents, Aaron Albert Mossell I and Eliza Bowers with their surviving five children, c. 1870–1875. From left to right are: Mary Mossell; Alvarilla Mossell; Charles Mossell; Aaron Albert Mossell II; and Nathan Francis Mossell (1856–1946).

Aaron Albert Mossell II was born in Hamilton, Canada West, in 1863, the youngest of nine children. His parents had moved with their first two children from Maryland to Hamilton in the 1850s to escape the racial discrimination in the United States.

His father, Aaron Albert Mossell I (born 1824), the grandson of slaves, became a brickmaker and in Hamilton went to school to learn to read and write. His mother Eliza Bowers was a free woman from Baltimore whose family had been deported to Trinidad when she was a child. She returned later and met Mossell senior. By 1865, the family had returned to the United States and lived in Lockport, New York. While in Lockport, Aaron Mossell I led the effort to desegregate the local school system and, in 2021, a local middle school was named in his honor.

Aaron Mossell II graduated from Lincoln University. He earned his law degree at the University of Pennsylvania Law School in 1888, the first African American to graduate.

Mossell practiced law with two African-American partners in offices in the Witherspoon Building. He was solicitor of the Frederick Douglass Memorial Hospital, where his brother Nathan Francis Mossell was medical director. He was said to have defended some African-American men after the racial riots of 1917–1919 in Philadelphia.

Mossell moved t0 Cardiff, in Wales, some time before 1930.

In 1945, Aaron Mossell attended the Fifth Pan-African Congress in Manchester representing the United Committee of Coloured and Colonial Organisations in Cardiff.

== Marriage and family ==
Mossell married Mary Louisa Tanner in Philadelphia around 1890. They had three children. Aaron Albert Tanner Mossell III (1893–1959) became a pharmacist in Philadelphia. Elizabeth Mossell Anderson (1894–1975) became Dean of Women at Virginia State College and later at Wilberforce University in Ohio. Sadie Tanner Mossell (1898–1985), also graduated from Penn and served as an editor of the Law Review., became a practicing lawyer, Assistant City Solicitor and activist on civil rights issues

Mossell separated from his wife and family when Sadie was about a year old, and the couple eventually divorced. Later, he moved to Cardiff, Wales, where he was living by the 1930s and remained the rest of his life, dying there on February 1, 1951, aged 87.
