= Frost Illustrated =

US newspaper

- Type: Weekly newspaper
- Format: Broadsheet
- Publisher: Edward N. Smith
- Founded: 1968
- Ceased publication: October 2017
- Headquarters: Fort Wayne, Indiana, United States
- Website: www.frostillustrated.com

Frost Illustrated was an independent weekly newspaper, featuring "News & Views of African Americans" in Fort Wayne, Indiana. Established in 1968, it was Fort Wayne's oldest weekly newspaper.

Frost was a member of the National Newspaper Association, the National Newspaper Publishers Association, and the Hoosier State Publishers Association, and the Greater Fort Wayne Chamber of Commerce.

Founded in 1968, at the outset the Frost had three competitors that catered to Fort Wayne's minority community. According to Frost Illustrated publisher Edward Smith, the paper differentiated itself through photography, marketing itself as an "illustrated" paper.

In 1969, African American cartoonist Grass Green drew the strip Lost Family for Frost Illustrated.

The final issue of Frost Illustrated covered the weeks of October 11–24, 2017. The cover story was about the new CEO of Fort Wayne's Lutheran Hospital.
