= Detroit Study Club =

The Detroit Study Club is a Black women's literary organization formed in 1898 by African American women in Detroit, Michigan, who were dedicated to individual intellectual achievement and Black community social betterment. The Club emerged in the 1890s around the same time as numerous other Black women's clubs across the country. The original creators of the Detroit Study Club established the club to increase their knowledge about literature and social issues. They later extended that work into community welfare endeavors. In 2018, the group celebrated one-hundred-and-twenty continuous years of activity.

== History ==
The Detroit Study Club was founded on March 2, 1898, when Gabrielle Pelham and five of her friends—Fannie Anderson, Sarah Warsaw, J. Pauline Smith, Mrs. Wil Anderson, and Mrs. Tomlison—met at Pelham's home to discuss literature and cultural and social issues. Pauline Smith served as the club's first president. Members initially called their group the Browning Study Club because they focused their attention on the writing of popular nineteenth-century British poet and playwright, Robert Browning (husband of poet Elizabeth Barrett Browning). For their motto, the club adopted a line of Browning's verse: “Let man contend to the uttermost for his life’s set prize.” After five years, group members expanded their scope and began to study other authors, art, religion, and history. In 1904, the women renamed their organization the Detroit Study Club but vowed to devote one annual meeting to Robert Browning's life and work. The Detroit Study Club was among many groups that made up the Black Women's Club Movement in the late 19th and early 20th centuries.

== Community engagement ==
Club members were concerned with the education of Black children and the support of elderly Black women. In 1897, Fannie Richards, a Study Club member and influential public school teacher, co-founded the Phillis Wheatley Home along for Aged Colored Ladies in Detroit with Mary McCoy (spouse of Colchester, Ontario, Canada and Ypsilanti inventor Elijah McCoy). Richards was the first president of the Wheatley Home, a secure space for Black elders. During the first half of the twentieth century, Detroit Study Club members held an annual Christmas party for Wheatley Home residents and donated five dollars each year for gifts.

In 1917, the National Association of Colored Women launched a fundraising campaign to save Cedar Hill, home of the abolitionist, writer, and activist, Frederick Douglass. NACW purchased and restored the home by drawing upon the effort of clubs across the country. The women of the Detroit Study Club sold commemorative spoons in order to fund the purchase and maintenance of the property. The campaign to save Cedar Hill and transform it into a memorial stemmed from Black club women's commitment to preserving the physical markers of African American cultural heritage and thereby honor the legacies of the Black past. The involvement of the Detroit Study Club in this national effort demonstrated the group's close ties to a broad network of club women. Cedar Hill, located in Anacostia, is now a National Historic Landmark operated by the National Park Service.

== Prominent figures ==
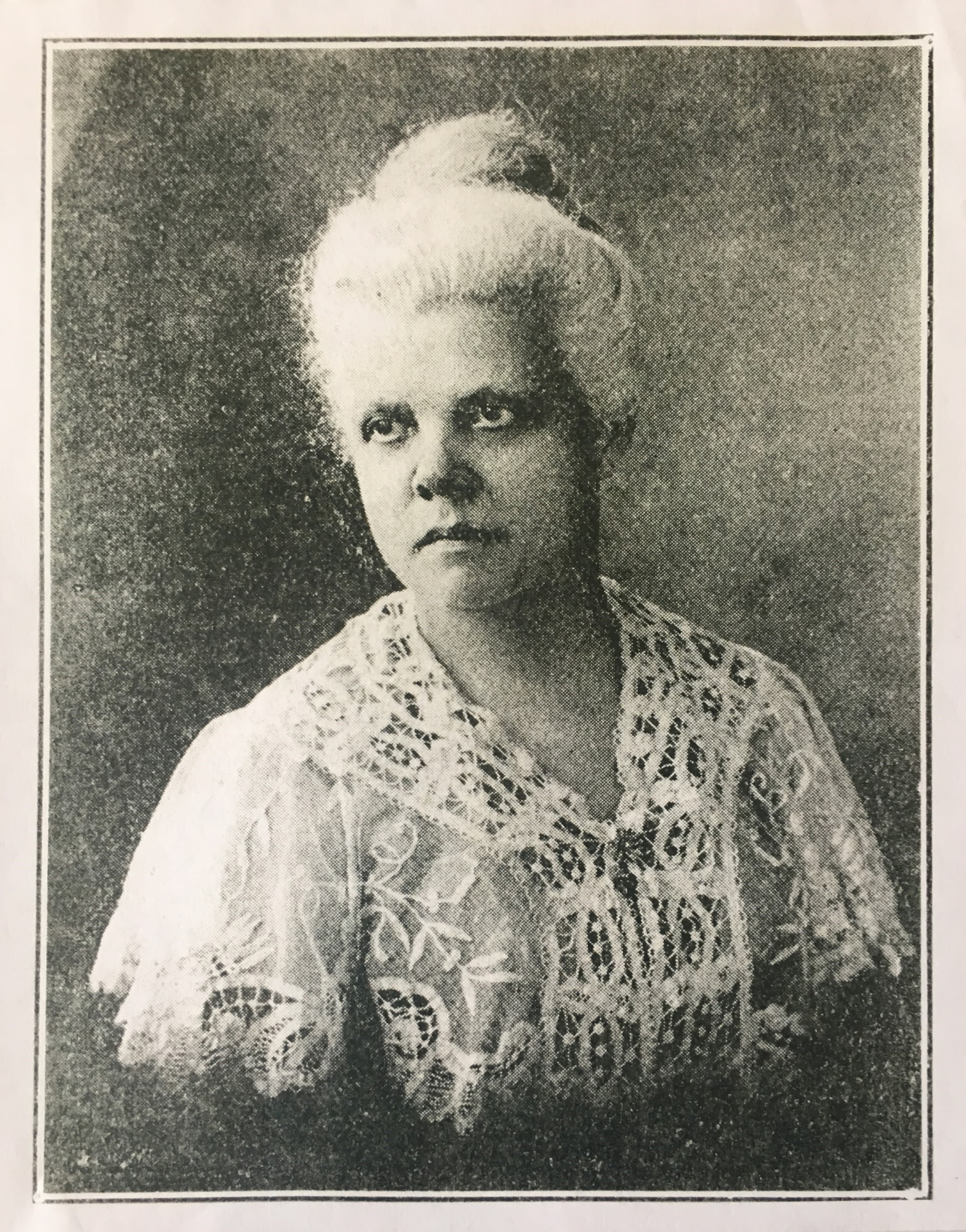
Mrs. Sammuel H. Russell, sixth president of the Detroit Study Club

- Gabrielle (Lewis) Pelham, founder of the Detroit Study Club, was born in Adrian, Michigan. She was the first woman to receive a bachelor's degree in music at Adrian College and the first person of color to hold a formal position in Michigan State's Music Teacher Association.
- Lillian Johnson was a writer, civil rights and women's rights activist who served as the eighth president of the Detroit Study Club in the early 1900s (1918-1920). Johnson created many of the organization's written materials, including event programs, invitations, and speeches.
- Fannie Richards was a member of the Detroit Study Club and Detroit's first African American teacher. She led efforts to desegregate Detroit public schools and contributed to American elementary education when she urged administrators to develop a trial kindergarten program as early as 1872, making Detroit one of the first U.S. cities to hold kindergarten classes. Richards was the co-founder and first president of the Phillis Wheatley Home for Aged Colored Ladies in Detroit.
- Margaret (McCall) Thomas Ward established and maintained the archives for the Detroit Study Club at the Burton Historical Collection of the Detroit Public Library. She was the first chair of the club's historical committee. Ward was the daughter of Margaret McCall, who, along with her husband, James McCall, published two Black newspapers: The Emancipator in Montgomery, Alabama, in the 1910s, and in 1933, the Detroit Tribune, a weekly.
- The Honorable Geraldine Bledsoe Ford, the first African American woman in the United States to be elected to a judgeship, was a member of the Detroit Study Club, as was her mother Mamie Geraldine Bledsoe, wife of Harold Bledsoe, the first African American to serve as a state attorney general in Michigan.
- The Honorable Chief Judge Denise Page Hood is a member of the Detroit Study Club. She was appointed to a federal judgeship on the United States District Court for the Eastern District of Michigan by President Bill Clinton in 1994. In 2016, Judge Hood became the chief judge for that district court and the fourth African American to hold a chief judgeship in a federal court.

== Public recognition ==
On May 10, 1999, President Bill Clinton congratulated the Detroit Study Club for their 100th anniversary in a letter. In April 2016, the Historical Society of Michigan recognized the Detroit Study Club's centennial longevity with the Milestone Award and a plaque noting the organization's contributions to the state's vitality and growth.
