= Emilie Davis =

19th-century African American diarist

Emilie Frances Davis
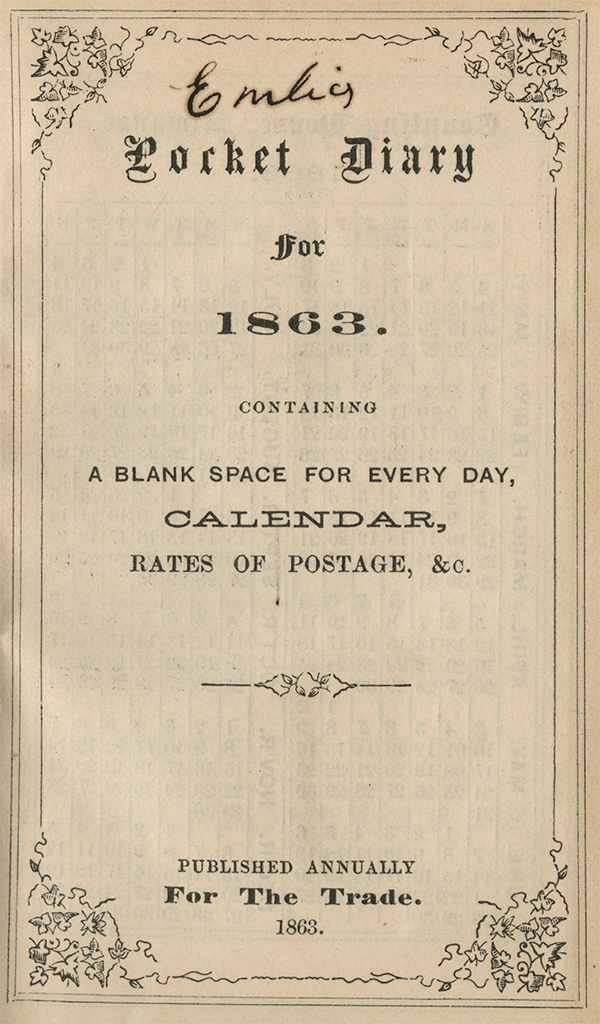
- Front cover of Davis's 1863 diary
- Born: February 18, 1839; Lancaster County, Pennsylvania, US
- Died: December 26, 1889 (aged 50); Philadelphia, Pennsylvania
- Resting place: Lebanon Cemetery
- Education: Institute for Colored Youth
- Occupations: Writer; seamstress
- Relatives: Jacob C. White Jr. (brother-in-law)
- Writing career
- Language: English
- Period: 1863–1965
- Subject: Diary

Emilie "Emily" Frances Davis (February 18, 1839 – December 26, 1889) was a free African American woman living in Philadelphia during the American Civil War. She wrote three pocket diaries for the years 1863, 1864, and 1865 recounting her perspective on the Emancipation Proclamation, the Battle of Gettysburg, and the mourning of President Lincoln. These diaries are unique in their depiction of 19th century life of urban African American women and reactions to the events of the Civil War.

== Early life and education ==
Davis was born free in southeastern Pennsylvania in 1839. Her father, Isaac Davis, moved to Pennsylvania from Maryland in the 1820s. Contemporary sources gave no account of her mother. The family lived in Lancaster and Schuylkill counties before relocating to the Seventh Ward of Philadelphia by 1860, the first year in which the census records Emilie Davis as a resident. She was one of 13,008 free Black women (in addition to 9,177 free Black men) recorded as living in Philadelphia County in 1860. In the mid-nineteenth century, the Seventh Ward was a hub of African American political, cultural, and religious life in Philadelphia.

Davis attended the Institute for Colored Youth and attended several black churches. She earned a living as a domestic servant and seamstress before her marriage. She was a member of the Ladies' Union Association of Philadelphia, which raised money and collected supplies for the United States Colored Troops.

== Writings ==
Between 1863 and 1864, Emilie described going out for ice cream on four separate occasions, an indication of the expanding space that black Philadelphians inhabited during the Civil War. Earlier, in the summer of 1857, Charlotte Forten and a friend had been refused service at three Philadelphia ice cream parlors before they gave up.

Davis wrote about notable lectures and concerts she attended. On January 25, 1865, she attended a lecture by J. Sella Martin, a former slave and fiery Baptist minister. On February 16, 1865, she attended a lecture by Frederick Douglass. On February 27, 1865, she attended a lecture by Frances Ellen Watkins Harper. On May 11, 1964, she attended a concert by Elizabeth Taylor Greenfield. On September 14, 1865, she attended a segregated concert by Thomas Wiggins, where she was required to sit in the balcony.

== Marriage and family ==
On December 13, 1866, Davis (her name misspelled as "Emily" on the marriage registry) married George Bustill White, a barber and civil rights activist. George White's father whose father, Jacob C. White Sr., was a prominent black businessman. His brother, Jacob C. White Jr., co-founded the Philadelphia Pythians basketball team and who became principal of the all-black Roberts Vaux Junior High School. George White was active in the Pennsylvania Equal Rights League, a group that lobbied successfully in Harrisburg for state support for federal civil rights amendments and at the local level for the integration of Philadelphia's streetcars in 1867.

Emilie and George had six children, Jacob C. White (b. 1867), Maria, Emilie (b. 1873), George (b. 1875), Carry (b. 1877), and Julia (b. 1881). In the 1880 census, Emilie's occupation was listed as “housekeeper.” In later years, she donated money to her church and rented a pew under her own name rather than her husband's, an indication of her place in the Black middle class.

== Death ==
Davis died on December 26, 1889, and was buried at Lebanon Cemetery, the burial place of Octavius Catto and other civil rights leaders of her generation. In 1903, she was reinterred to an unmarked grave at Eden Cemetery in Collingdale, Pennsylvania when Lebanon Cemetery closed.

Her husband, George White, died on June 1, 1899.

== Archives ==
Davis's diaries have been digitized and annotated by researchers. They are held at the Historical Society of Pennsylvania, and page images are available online at the Pennsylvania State University and Villanova University web sites. First-person written accounts of black American women of her time are rare.
