= Banneker Institute =

Former African American literary society

Benjamin Banneker Institute was a literary society for African Americans established in Philadelphia in 1854. Members lectured and debated on various subjects. It was named for Benjamin Banneker.

Prominent members included Jacob C. White Jr., Robert M. Adger, and Octavius V. Catto. There was a 50 cent entrance fee and annual dues of $2.00. It operated until 1872 and was succeeded by the Afro-American Historical Society which Adger founded in 1879. The records of the institute were donated to the Historical Society of Pennsylvania in the 1930s.

Jesse Ewing Glasgow was a corresponding member of the institute. Sarah Mapps Douglass taught evening classes to African-American women at meetings of the Banneker Institute on issues of physiology and hygiene.

William T. Catto was a founding member of the Banneker Institute and wrote A Semi-Centenary Discourse: A History of the First African Presbyterian Church in Philadelphia. His son Octavius Valentine Catto graduated from the Institute for Colored Youth and returned to it as a teacher in 1859. He served as member and recording secretary of the Banneker Institute. In October 1871, he was shot and killed in election violence targeting African Americans who voted Republican.

A historical marker commemorating the institute is at 409 South 11th Street.
