= William Henry Dorsey =

American artist and collector (1837–1923)

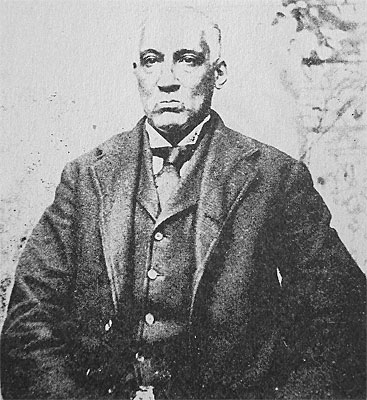
- William Henry Dorsey, 1903 (from Colored American magazine)
- Born: October 23, 1837; Philadelphia, Pennsylvania, U.S.
- Died: January 9, 1923; Philadelphia, Pennsylvania, U.S.
- Burial place: Eden Cemetery
- Other name: William H. Dorsey
- Occupations: Artist, collector, scrapbooker, bibliophile, numismatist
- Employer(s): American Negro Historical Society, a founder and custodian of documents

William Henry Dorsey (October 23, 1837 – January 9, 1923) was an American bibliophile, artist, scrapbooker, numismatist, social historian and collector of Black history and art. He was most noted for the 388 scrapbooks he compiled of newspaper and magazine clippings chronicling Black life in his hometown of Philadelphia and across the country during the 19th century.

== Early life and family history ==
Dorsey was born in Philadelphia on October 23, 1837, into a prosperous family headed by his father Thomas J. Dorsey, a noted caterer and part of the Black elite. Thomas escaped slavery from a plantation in Maryland in the 1830s and made his way to Philadelphia with his brothers, including Basil Dorsey. They ended up on the farm of Black abolitionist Robert Purvis. Thomas was captured and returned, but the friends he made in Philadelphia raised money to buy his freedom in 1836.

He was among a "triumvirate of colored caterers ‘who some years ago might have been said to rule the social world of Philadelphia through its stomach", one newspaper reported in 1896. The others were Henry Jones and Henry Minton. Thomas' catering business was so successful that he and his family lived a privileged lifestyle, owning a home on Locust Street, one of the premier addresses in the city, and other properties.

Some of the major figures of the day ate at his table: abolitionists Frederick Douglass and Pennsylvania Congressman William D. Kelley; Massachusetts Sen. Charles Sumner, an anti-slavery activist, and William Lloyd Garrison, publisher of the abolitionist newspaper the Liberator. Dorsey's wife accompanied Douglass to President Lincoln's second inauguration dinner. Son William was bequeathed a letter that Sumner wrote to Thomas. It was among his prized possessions.

Thomas married a free Black woman named Louisa Tobias. William was their oldest and only son, and they had two daughters, Sarah and Mary Louise. Dorsey attended Bird School and the Institute for Colored Youth (which later became Cheyney University), attended by the children of well-to-do parents. He eschewed following in his father's footsteps as a caterer and deemed himself an artist. He studied with Antonio Zeno Shindler.

When Thomas died, he left a trust that ensured his family a life of comfort, but Dorsey also worked for a living. He was a personal messenger for Mayor William S. Stokley from 1872 to 1881. As a member of the Old Reliable Club of Pennsylvania, made up of prominent Black men in the state, he endorsed Stokely for re-election in 1881. After Stokley was defeated, the new mayor Samuel King removed Dorsey as a messenger but later hired him as a turnkey at the Central Station.

Dorsey's granddaughter described him as somber man who was a loner, big, with high cheekbones and the "reddish color" of a Native American. He was also described as courtly and polished.

In 1859 at the age of 22, he traveled to the slaveholding state of Georgia to marry Virginia Cashin, who had been born in Alabama in 1839. The couple had six children. She was listed as a dressmaker in the 1880 Census. Dorsey was a member of St. Thomas Episcopal Church, the first Black Episcopal church in the country founded in 1792 under the leadership of Absalom Jones.

He was also politically active in the Old Reliable Club, and as vice president and secretary of the Charles Sumner Club, a literary, social and political organization founded in 1873. Both of these Republican groups endorsed candidates.

== An ardent scrapbooker ==
Dorsey caught the collecting bug from his father, who was known for his large array of books and memorabilia. The son's greatest collection were his scrapbooks, 388 of which are still around today but in derelict condition. Dorsey clipped and saved his first newspaper article in 1866, a short item about the death of his great-grandmother who was 100 years old. He earnestly began scrapbooking in 1870 and continued until 1903 when he posted his last article.

The scrapbooks illustrate the lives of Black people in America in the 19th century. The articles and other items were culled from Black and white newspapers and journals in Boston, San Francisco, Philadelphia, Washington, DC, and elsewhere. In some instances, he juxtaposed the harsh treatment of Blacks next to their ability to rise above the inhumanity inflicted on them. The contents included the "good and the bad. The beautiful and the ugly. Crime, scandal, fashion and vaudeville", as well as recipes, menus, meeting notes, social announcements, politics and lynchings. The scrapbooks also included articles about Native Americans, Africans and Pacific Islanders. They showed Dorsey's interest in archaeology, natural history, crime, scandal, literature and theater.

He was among the consultants to W.E.B. DuBois when the historian researched his study of the Black population in the city in the late 1890s and compiled them in the book "The Philadelphia Negro". DuBois also used the scrapbooks as a resource.

== His home museum ==
Dorsey had one of the most impressive and eclectic collections of items about Black history, as well as history of other peoples. A number of people gifted him with books, pictures, scrapbooks, catalogs and artifacts for the collection.

He assembled a museum on the second floor of his home at 206 Dean Street in Philadelphia. The museum was such a novelty that articles were written about it - and him. James Wesley Cromwell, a journalist and owner/editor of the People's Advocate in Washington, DC, visited the museum in 1874. He wrote a story for the New National Era published by Douglass.

"It was in the front room of the second story of one of those small but cosy homes of the many narrow streets of Philadelphia that we were ushered into a miniature museum and art gallery, the private collection of our old friend, Mr. William H. Dorsey, of that city. Our surprise at what was in store for us was so unexpected and complete, and withal so pleasant, that we cannot resist the temptation to give the readers of the National Era an opportunity of realizing the same pleasure".

Cromwell described in detail the variety of items that he saw, including a mosaic of the British Houses of Parliament; a landscape on the Hudson River, an oil painting on canvas only an inch and a half in diameter; Charlemagne in Italian marble and a piece of stair taken from the home of the artist Thomas Sully.

He was just as impressed with Dorsey's collection of books, pamphlets, artifacts, musical compositions, artwork and engravings of prominent Black people, along with photos, autographed letters and facsimiles. The books included the lives of African kings and scholars, Phillis Wheatley's poetry published in 1881 and "Sketches of the Higher Classes of Colored Society in Philadelphia" (1841). He also saw the book "Literature of Negroes" (1801), stating "This work is regarded as the very best authority extant at that day, and it is doubted whether it has since been surpassed". Also included were the works of Africans Ignatius Sancho, Ben Solomon (Ayuba Suleiman Diallo) and Jacobus Capitein, all of whom managed to escape slavery and became great men.

The white newspaper Philadelphia Times wrote about the museum three times in October 1896. In a first short article, reporter Louis Megargee wrote about Dorsey. In the second, he laid out a long story about the museum and its contents. He declared it the "most remarkable little museum in the country. There is certainly no other like it". Megargee noted much the same as Cromwell, but he also mentioned the scrapbooks, coins, canes, china, relics, and items relating to slavery and emancipation. He mentioned "Tribute to the Negro" - a book that was very popular at Bird School, but "now out of print and rarely seen".

Among the items in the scrapbooks were engravings of ministers Absalom Jones and Richard Allen, both of which were presented to Dorsey by Allen's daughter; a photo of Nick Biddle, a Black man who in 1861 was the first person wounded in the Civil War, and portraits of Black musician Francis Johnson and actor Ira Aldridge.

Megargee was awed by Dorsey's collection of paintings by white artists Thomas Moran and James Hamilton and Black artists John G. Chaplin, Robert S. Duncanson and Dorsey himself. Included was "Night on the Delaware" by Hamilton, painted in 1874. Hamilton's autograph was on the back, and Dorsey had refused requests to sell it".

Later in October, in a third story without a byline, a writer expounded on the vastness of the collection. The newspaper posted drawings of rooms in the museum: "three rooms divided and subdivided filled with shelves and tables and pendants hanging from the ceiling. … With his early art training he has hung pictures on the walls, doors on both sides, wherever there is room to hang". A series of 12 of his own figure studies hung on a door between two rooms.

Books, scrapbooks, artifacts, pamphlets, Native American relics (flints, battle axes, implements), guns and bayonets covered every surface. There was Benjamin Banneker's 1795 almanac, a portrait and photo of Sojourner Truth and letters dictated by her. Dorsey's compilation of materials about Douglass filled three volumes of "almost everything" that had appeared in newspapers, along with personal letters to Dorsey. There were also unusual items: parts of a girder from the Liberty Bell, a brick from Independence Hall and fragments from buildings erected for the Philadelphia Centennial Exhibition in 1876.

The museum also included a heavy leather-covered Bible printed in Germany in 1736, owned by Dorsey's grandfather and handed down to Dorsey by his mother. Above the Bible hung a framed copy of the Boston Gazette from March 12, 1770, with an article about the death of Crispus Attucks, the first person killed in the Revolutionary War. Another item was a candelabrum from an auction in Bordentown, New Jersey, in the 1840s of items owned by Joseph Bonaparte, the brother of Napoleon. There was a landscape by Duncanson titled "The Evening", and a painting titled "Emancipation" and a head of Michelangelo by his friend Chaplin.

Dorsey had an autograph of African American sculptor Edmonia Lewis, retrieved when she was 23. He tried to find a biography of her in her early 20s but apparently could not. He searched for a portrait of Attacks until he was convinced that no one had painted him.

"It has been my continual aim, as I have journeyed along, to gather every fragment of published matter concerning the colored race", Dorsey told the writer. "I have spared neither time nor money in prosecuting this hobby – you may call it, if you wish – and the fruits of my labor are beginning to show. Naturally, in all these years, I have been an enthusiast in garnering anything and everything that had to me an intrinsic value; but the most careful work and best results", pointing to the shelves under discussion, which are so well filled with material respecting the colored man. "I have here. Nothing of importance has escaped me, as I am a subscriber and reader of the more important books and magazines, and while I seldom preserve any data in its original state, you will find it cut out and placed in its proper position. I have not made any history; I have simply collated, and to anyone wishing to write an essay or volume upon the history and progress of the colored race in this nineteenth century, I have material that cannot be duplicated elsewhere. My portraits, books and letters are simply priceless, and nothing gives me more pleasure than to show and explain them to anyone feeling sufficient interest in them to visit me".

== Black collectors and the American Negro Historical Society ==
Dorsey was among a small group of collectors of Black history. Like him, Cromwell and Edward M. Thomas had both assembled huge collections in their homes. A writer named Box wrote a story for the Weekly Anglo-African of New York in 1860 about Thomas' collection, which included a Dorsey watercolor of an ancient tower in ruins. "Mr. Dorsey is a young and talented artist, and bids fair to rank among the first in his profession in this country", Box wrote.

In 1862, Thomas began planning an exhibition to be held in New York in October 1863. The first national Exhibition of Anglo-Africa Industry and Art was akin to a world's fair, with steam engines and machinery, artwork, carriages and vehicles, furniture, cooking utensils, clothing and perfumes, and embroidery and needlework. The emphasis, though, was on art. The exhibition was to be financed by the sale of shares in the Anglo-African Institute, of which Dorsey was a board member. Thomas died in March 1863 before the exhibition was finalized, and it never materialized.

Two years later, his coins, books and autographs were advertised to be sold at auction by his wife. His paintings were apparently sold at some point, too, because Dorsey ended up with a Thomas bust created by white sculptor John Quincy Adams Ward. Thomas' portrait of Haitian liberator Toussiant L'Ouverture by Chaplin also became part of Dorsey's collection.

Dorsey was a founder of the American Negro Historical Society (ANHS), organized October 25, 1897. It was an idea of historian/collector Roger M. Adger, but he was not the first to come up with it. In 1883, George Washington Williams, the first Black member of the Ohio Legislature and author of "The History of the Negro Race in America 1619-1880", suggested a society to preserve the history of Black people. His idea never took hold.

Organizers of the new ANHS included men and women: Dorsey, Adger, Rev. Matthew Anderson, Rev. Henry L. Phillips, Walter P. Hall, Alfred S. Cassey, Robert Jones, James. W. Caldwell, Charles H. Brooks, William Potter, William C. Bolivar, Henry S. Martin, Hans Shadd, Frances E.W. Harper, P. Albert Dutrieuille, Christopher J. Perry Sr., Joshua B. Matthews, Thomas Ringgold, Levi Oberton and Theophilus J. Minton. The ANHS' purpose was to "collect relics, literature, historical facts in connection with the African race, illustrative of their progress and development".

At its monthly meetings, the group offered a forum for presentation of scholarly papers and discussions pertaining to Black history, art, music, schools, industrialization and more, and these were open to the public. Among the speakers were DuBois, Harper, Minton, Cromwell, Adger, Algernon B. Jackson, Alice Moore Dunbar, Mary Ardley Smith, Alain LeRoy Locke, Jessie Fauset, Caroline LaCount and Rev. John B. Reeve.

Among its other activities: organized a memorial service for abolitionist Purvis, held a memorial meeting on the centennial of the anniversary of the birth of Sumner, sent a delegation to the funeral of King (the first mayor to appoint Black police officers) and held an emancipation day celebration on the 35th anniversary of signing of the proclamation.

Once its member Bolivar, a noted bibliophile and writer, was offered a column in the Philadelphia Tribune, the lectures were discontinued. The organization received donations of books, pamphlets, autographs, pictures, programs and artifacts that were placed with Dorsey, who was its custodian and also a donor. The society also received items from the collections of Adger and Jacob C. White Jr. In 1934, Leon Gardiner passed on some ANHS materials to the Historical Society of Pennsylvania.

== Dorsey the artist ==
He was just as committed to creating art as collecting it. He produced commissioned works and participated in several exhibitions, but apparently won no prizes. He considered himself a professional painter - unlike Bolivar and Adger, who were hobbyists – and he was determined to stick with it.

Dorsey was among a handful of Black professional artists during the 19th century. (Joshua Johnson, who died in 1824, was the earliest.) In a newspaper article about the Black population in Philadelphia in 1867, the Evening Telegraph named Dorsey as one of five artists, along with one photographer. The others were David Bustill Bowser (portrait, decorative and banner painter, the most noted), Robert Douglass Jr. (portrait painter), Raymond J. Barr (painter), Cassey (wood carver and a founder of ANHS) and Galloway W. Cheston (photographer). At the time, Dorsey was 28 years old and was described as a young man who had "decided artistic ability". He had a studio at 1104 Locust Street that was filled with his oil and watercolor landscapes.

In its "Annual Exhibition Record of the Pennsylvania Academy of the Fine Arts from 1807-1870", the academy (PAFA) listed a "William H. Dorsay (or Dorsey)" as an exhibitor. According to the entry, Dorsey was born circa 1824 with an address at 1104 Locust Street in the years 1867 and 1868. At least five works were shown in the exhibition, including "Coast Scene", a Dorsey artwork mentioned by Roger Lane in his book "William Dorsey's Philadelphia & Ours: On the Past and Future of the Black City in America".

In 1884, a correspondent for the New York Globe stated that Dorsey was one of two artists in an upcoming exhibition in New Orleans "whose paintings have secured them almost national fame. I refer to William H. Dorsey and Henry O. Tanner". There appears to be no documentation of Dorsey exhibiting outside Philadelphia or in mixed-race venues, according to author Lane, who described the artist's style as "conventional". In some instances, Dorsey copied the subjects of other well-known artists.

In November 1880, Dorsey exhibited with Henry Ossawa Tanner, Douglass, Duncanson, Bowser, Edward Mitchell Bannister and Alfred Stidum - known for his portraits in crayon - at the Working Men's Club of Philadelphia. "This the first enterprise of this kind ever started among people", stated the People's Advocate newspaper. "The exhibits are all works of colored artists and some of them are very creditable". In 1884, he participated in the Progressive Workingmen's Club Fair, and in 1889, the Industrial Exposition of works by Black people sponsored by the Ladies Quaker City Association. One newspaper reported that his paintings were among the best watercolors in the show but incorrectly attributed them to a schoolteacher in Brooklyn.

In the spring of 1887, he illustrated a story for the Philadelphia Tribune about problems at Olive Cemetery, including neglect, flooding and falling stones. He exhibited at several industrial fairs that were organized to raise money to help pay the debts of the Christian Recorder newspaper, whose focus was on news about Black people. The aim of the fairs was to demonstrate the industrial and artistic skills of the Black population, who were asked to donate items for sale. In her book "Reminiscences of School Life, and Hints on Teaching" (1913), Fanny Jackson Coppin told of the 1879 fair and contributions by such "well-known" artists as Tanner, whose father was editor of the paper; Douglass and Dorsey. He also participated in the 1891 fair along with Bolivar, Adger and Lewis, whose entry was a pair of busts.

In 1897, Dorsey and Jones, an ANHS founder and author, created a model for a monument to honor Octavius V. Catto, a Black activist and schoolteacher who was killed in 1871 on Election Day by a white man. Black residents of Philadelphia had been quietly planning the memorial, which was to be erected in Merion Cemetery at 513 S. 15th Street. The granite monument was designed as triangular in shape, 14 feet at the base and 21 feet high with openings on each side. A life-size bronze head of Catto was to be placed at the main entrance, and his remains were to be placed in a cement sarcophagus inside the monument. Funds were to be raised to build it. Dorsey kept articles about Catto's death in his scrapbooks.

In 1890, the Philadelphia Times newspaper counted Dorsey as one of five professional painters in the city, along with Douglas, Bowser, Tanner and Stidum. Dorsey and these Black artists struggled to be acknowledged. When a reader of Cromwell's newspaper in 1877 bemoaned the paucity of Black subjects and portraits, he asked Dorsey to respond.

Noting that the list was too short, Dorsey pointed to portraits painted by Douglass and Chaplin, and identified Bowser, Patrick Henry Reason, Duncanson, Bannister and Lewis, who had won praise at the 1876 Philadelphia Centennial Exhibition for her sculpture "The Death of Cleopatra". He noted that Black artists faced obstacles because of the "unending prejudice of the dominant race to buffet him from place to place, for only a few years have elapsed since we have been admitted, even as visitors, to … art exhibits".

== His death ==
Dorsey and his family lived on his income as a messenger for Stokley and a turnkey for King, the money he received from his artwork, his share of his father's trust and his own real estate holdings, as well as the money from his wife's dressmaking work. The couple separated in 1892, and he moved to the property on Dean Street where he established his museum. He lived alone in his later years and became progressively blind. He died on January 9, 1923, and is buried in Eden Cemetery.

Of Dorsey's broad collection, his scrapbooks survived. After his death, a son presumably handed the scrapbooks over to Cheyney University where they were stored and forgotten until 1976. They were recovered among the effects of former president Leslie Pinckney Hill. They were not in good condition. In an agreement, Cheyney has allowed Pennsylvania State University to assess them for conservation. Cheyney has 260 of the scrapbooks on microfilm and also has photographs from Dorsey's collection.
