= Jesse Ewing Glasgow =

- Born: Jesse Ewing Glasgow Jr. c. 1823; Philadelphia, Pennsylvania, U.S.
- Died: 20 December 1860 (aged 22–23); Edinburgh, Scotland
- Known for: African-American transatlantic intellectual

Jesse Ewing Glasgow Jr. (c. 1823 – 20 December 1860) was an African-American intellectual from Philadelphia, who studied at the University of Edinburgh from 1858 to 1860. He authored the radical pamphlet on John Brown's Harper's Ferry Raid in 1859.

== Biography ==
Jesse Ewing Glasgow Jr. was born around 1823 in Philadelphia as a free African American. His father, Jesse Glasgow, was a whitewasher and an active member in the Philadelphian African American community (his signature appears at the bottom of the famous “Men of Color, To Arms! Now or Never!” broadside, published in 1863). Glasgow enrolled in the Institute for Colored Youth at age 14 upon its opening in 1837.

The Institute for Colored Youth (ICY) was a prestigious Black school. Although established in 1837 as a trade school, the ICY evolved to adopt a liberal arts curriculum, and employed Black teachers. The faculty of the institute included the likes of Professor Charles L Reason and Robert Campbell.

Glasgow excelled at the Institute, even among his peers who were offspring of the black intellectual elite. An account from his teacher Frances Jackson-Coppin recalls an incident where the principal had invited a phrenologist to the school in order to disprove his belief in black intellectual inferiority. She recounts that the phrenologist

asked Mr. Bassett to bring out his highest class. There was in the class at that time Jesse Glasgow, a very black boy. All he asked was a chance. Just as fast as they gave the problems, Jesse put them on the board with the greatest ease.

Glasgow became ICY’s first graduate in 1856, and afterwards gained a place at the University of Edinburgh. Due to his reputation for intellectual prowess, managers and peers competed to pay for his transatlantic trip and tuition. At Edinburgh, Glasgow excelled in all of his classes and won several academic prizes in Greek, English, and mathematics, graduating in 1858.

== Influence in Scotland ==
Whilst physically in Scotland, Glasgow maintained a presence in the Philadelphian African American community through his involvement with the Banneker Institute. The Banneker Institute, named after African American mathematician Benjamin Banneker, was founded in 1853 as one of several intellectual and debating organisations in nineteenth-century Philadelphia. Organised by and for Black Philadelphians, the Institute had a particular mission to promote self-education to create 'a unified black consciousness that would, in turn, provide an informed social and political leadership for African Americans' Banneker heavily recruited young members from the ICY, and Glasgow’s fellow ICY graduates, Jacob C. White Jr. and Octavius Catto, also became leaders in the organisation.

== Publications ==
In 1859, Glasgow published a 47-page pamphlet called ‘The Harpers Ferry Insurrection: Being an Account of the Late Outbreak in Virginia, and of the Trial and Execution of Captain John Brown, Its Hero’. This was an account expressing sympathy for white abolitionist John Brown and others who led an unsuccessful raid on Harpers Ferry, a federal armoury in Virginia, in October 1859. It was published in Edinburgh, Glasgow and London.

In the pamphlet Glasgow relates his experiences of racism in Scotland to the experiences of African-descended people in the United States. He condemned the institution of slavery and hailed John Brown as a hero in the history of anti-slavery movements. The pamphlet also addressed Glasgow's Scottish readers directly, appealing to them to take up the anti-slavery cause in the United States. He quoted the words of Sir Walter Scott in the pamphlet's opening.

== Death ==
On 20 December 1860 Glasgow died of tuberculosis aged 23 in his Newington home (10 Hill Place), before he had completed his studies at Edinburgh. His death was commemorated in Scottish newspapers and by the Banneker Institute. The latter not only issued statements of sorrow, but celebrated Glasgow's academic achievements - aiming to highlight the intellectual capacity of people of African heritage and challenge the contemporary notion of white supremacy, in particular, within academic and political spheres. The readership of Glasgow's work improved the perception of African-descended people in English-speaking parts of the United States and Great Britain. Not only his articulate argumentation for the abolition of slavery reached a wide transatlantic audience thus raising the profile of the abolitionist cause, but Glasgow himself exemplified the success of a liberal education for young black people. At a time when dominant racial theory dictated that African heritage equalled inferiority to whiteness, Glasgow subverted cultural norms for the academic position of black people and garnered international support for a political and social movement.

== Publication ==
- Glasgow, J. Ewing (1860). The Harpers Ferry insurrection: being an account of the late outbreak in Virginia, and of the trial and execution of Captain John Brown, its hero. Edinburgh.
