= 1865 Pennsylvania State Equal Rights League Convention =

This was the first meeting of the Pennsylvania State Equal Rights League, which was a civil rights organization formed to promote equal rights for African American citizens of the state. The Pennsylvania State Equal Rights League was part of a nationwide movement to promote legal and political rights for black Americans.

== Proceedings of the Convention ==
This convention convened in Harrisburg, Pennsylvania at the Union Wesleyan Church from February 8–10, 1865. Two sessions were held per day. The morning session was from 9:30am to 12:30pm, and the afternoon session was from 2pm to 5pm. Each session was opened with prayer.

=== Resolutions Adopted ===
1. African American citizens of Pennsylvania should commit themselves to studying industrial, mercantile, commercial, and literary topics.
2. Southern freedmen should pursue moral and religious edification, as well as frugality, self-reliance, and practical education. Assistance was offered to them in these regards, and the League extended its warmest brotherly concern.
3. All due effort was to be put forth toward gaining nationwide elective franchise.
4. The Pennsylvania State Equal Rights League would support the decisions made by the National Equal Rights League.

Rules for the conduction of future League meetings were also established:

1. A quorum on business was to be made of a third of the members of the Convention.
2. No motion would be received unless the Speaker of the Convention was present at the bar.
3. No Convention member would be allowed to speak more than twice on any single question unless they were given special permission to do so. Contributions were to be limited to ten minutes of floor time for the first, and five minutes for the second.
4. Each member of the Convention would pay $2 for membership.
5. A collection would be taken at the end of each Convention session, the proceeds of which would support Convention business.

=== Legacy of the Convention ===
A devoted contingent of interracial civil rights activists was established and supported by the work of this Convention, though the emphasis was still on activists of color. The members of the Convention acknowledged and welcomed the input and effort of "... the friends of Equal Rights without regard to color." Members of the Convention petitioned Congress for nationwide citizenship and enfranchisement. They published an address to the citizens of Pennsylvania, explaining the reasons for the League's formation, and calling for equal rights to be conferred upon the colored people of Pennsylvania; they reminded citizens and lawmakers that colored people had once been considered legal citizens of the state, and those rights had been taken from them.

Special mention was made of the women whose work supported the Convention. The Convention offered thanks to the women who worked to alleviate the suffering of African-American soldiers and pledged to help them however possible, though Convention membership was not offered to women.

== Notable Members ==
Some parties to the convention were prominent civil rights activists. These men were elected to office within the League.

William Nesbit was elected president of the League. He was instrumental in lobbying Congress for the passage of the Fourteenth Amendment.

Octavius Catto, George B. Vashon, and Jacob C. White Jr. were elected as secretaries over the longer course of the League's lifespan. For this first meeting, Octavius Catto, Redman Fausett, and Alex T. Harris served as secretaries.

== See also ==
- Colored Conventions Movement
- National Equal Rights League
- Octavius Catto
- William Nesbit
