= Caroline LeCount =

American educator and civil rights activist (c.1846–1923)

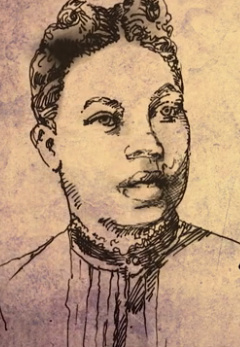
- Born: Caroline Rebecca Le Count c. 1846; Philadelphia, Pennsylvania, U.S.
- Died: January 24, 1923 (aged 76–77)
- Resting place: Eden Cemetery, Pennsylvania, U.S.
- Education: Institute for Colored Youth
- Occupations: Educator and civil rights activist
- Known for: Anti-segregation activism
- Partner: Octavius Catto (fiancé)

Caroline Rebecca Le Count (c. 1846 – January 24, 1923; often written as LeCount) was an American educator and civil rights activist from Philadelphia, Pennsylvania. She is often compared to later activist Rosa Parks for her early efforts to desegregate public transportation.

== Early life ==
LeCount was born in South Philadelphia in 1846 as one of four children. Her father, James LeCount, was a cabinet maker and undertaker who was probably involved in the Underground Railroad, as stories have been passed down about him hiding slaves in coffins. Caroline began school at a young age and graduated at the top of her five-person class from the Institute for Colored Youth in 1863.

== Career ==
After LeCount passed the teaching exam, becoming the first black woman in Philadelphia to do so, she began teaching at the Ohio Street School (later renamed the Octavius V. Catto School). She became principal around 1868, making her the second black female principal in Philadelphia. She notably defended black teachers from an accusation of inferiority, pointing out that they were required to receive higher test scores than white teachers in order to become certified. She retired in 1911.

LeCount was an accomplished orator and poetry reader. She read at the openings of various churches and was noted by The Christian Recorder for her ability to imitate an Irish accent when needed.

Along with Jacob C. White Jr. and William Carl Bolivar, LeCount helped sociologist W. E. B. Du Bois with research for his study The Philadelphia Negro.

== Activism ==
LeCount was part of the Ladies' Union Association, an organization of women supporting the Union in the American Civil War. As part of their efforts, she and other black women would ride streetcars to deliver supplies to troops even though black riders were often removed by force. LeCount and others would board, be forcefully removed, and then appeal to the courts and the public to ban discrimination on streetcars. LeCount, along with her fiancé Octavius Catto and abolitionist William Still, also made petitions and lobbying efforts towards desegregation. The historian Daniel R. Biddle noted that "Caroline Le Count did almost the same thing as Rosa Parks did, but her streetcar in 1867 was powered by a horse."

When the city passed a law in 1867 banning segregation on public transport, LeCount successfully brought charges against a driver who wouldn't let her ride. The city then issued an official notice to its transit companies that they were no longer allowed to discriminate against black passengers.

== Death and legacy ==
LeCount died on January 24, 1923, and was buried at Eden Cemetery in Collingdale, Pennsylvania. Because of her refusal to leave segregated streetcars, LeCount has been called "Philly's Rosa Parks" in some modern media outlets.

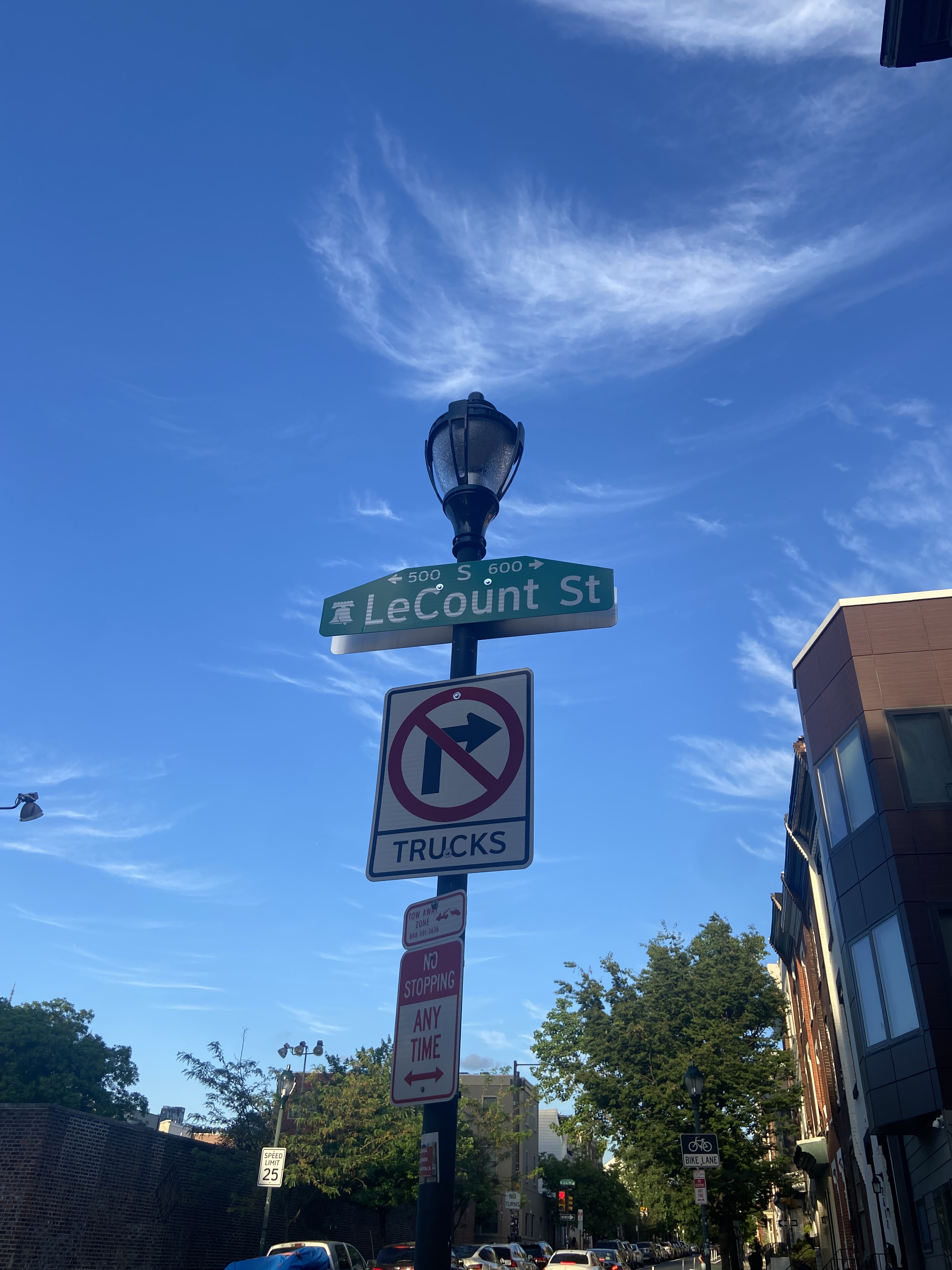
Street sign at the intersection of LeCount and South

In 2022, some Philadelphia residents began petitioning to rename the city's Taney Street–named for Roger B. Taney, the Supreme Court justice who decided Dred Scott v. Sandford–after LeCount. To mark the centennial of her death, the "Rename Taney" group commissioned a headstone to mark LeCount's grave and organized a ceremony at the site. According to organizers, the renaming campaign garnered the support of 90% of residents along the street. The street was officially renamed in November 2024.

== See also ==
- Civil disobedience
- Nathaniel Booth (slave)
