= Robert M. Adger =

Bibliophile. Civil rights organizer

Robert Mara Adger Jr. (c. 1837 – June 10, 1910) was a businessman and bibliophile in Philadelphia. His family owned a collectibles shop and lived adjacent. He became a member of the Banneker Institute at the age of 17 and became its president in his mid twenties. He amassed an important collection of books and periodicals by and about African Americans and donated it for posterity. The "Catalogue of rare books on slavery and negro authors on science, history, poetry, religion, biography, etc." was printed from the holdings in his private collection. In 1981, Rare Afro-Americana: A Reconstruction of the Adger Library was published.

Adger was born in Charleston, South Carolina, to Mary Ann Morong, a Native American, and Robert Adger Sr. He had 12 siblings. In 1848 the family moved to Philadelphia and he studied at the Bird School. He worked at his store. He became a director of the Philadelphia Building and Loan Association, a mortgage company serving African-Americans and joined the Black Enlistment Committee help recruit black soldiers for the Union Army during the American Civil War. He founded a fraternal organization and was involved with civil rights groups including the Pennsylvania Equal Rights League. He helped found the Afro-American Historical Society that included his personal collection of books, pamphlets, and other materials related to African Americans and the antislavery movement.

He died of a heart attack on June 10, 1910, and his funeral was held at 1115 Lombard Street, his final place of residence. He is buried at the Merion Cemetery in Merion, Pennsylvania.

== Fate of Collection ==
In 1906 Robert Adger sold his books to Ella Smith Albert who was the second black student to graduate from Wellesley College. Ella donated Adger's book collection to Wellesley College in 1938 where it became scattered. There have been attempts to retrieve these volumes and those that are found are housed separately at the Wellesley College Rare Book Room.

== Legacy ==
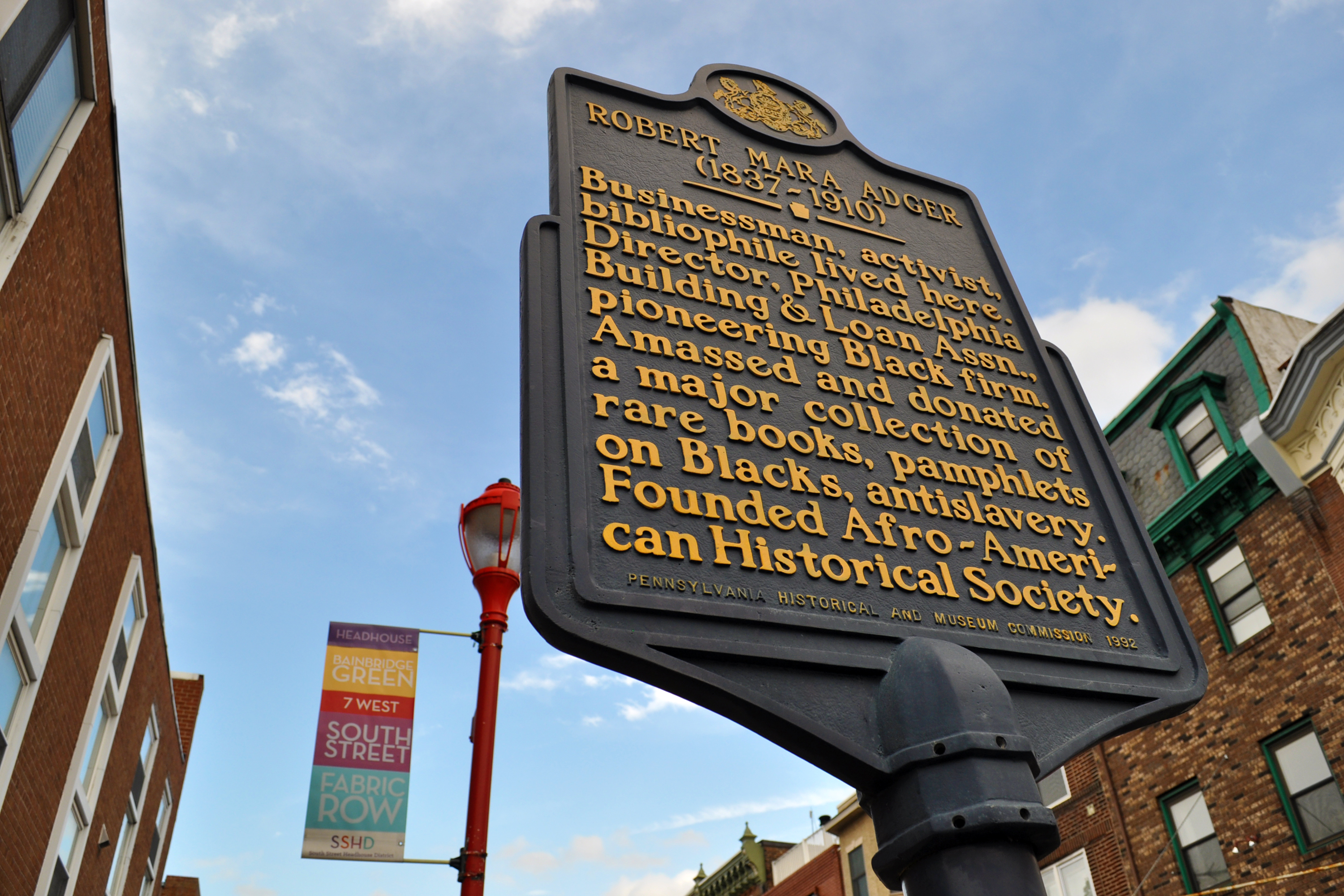

A historical marker commemorates his life at the site of his home at 823 South Street.
