= Nathaniel Booth =

Nathaniel Booth may refer to:

- Nathaniel Booth, 4th Baron Delamer (1709–1770), English peer
- Nathaniel Booth (slave) (1826–1901), escaped African-American slave
