= Frazelia Campbell =

American classical scholar

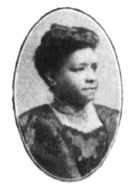
- Born: March 18, 1849; Charleston, South Carolina, USA
- Died: November 5, 1930 (aged 81); Philadelphia, Pennsylvania, USA
- Occupations: Classicist; Teacher

Academic work
- Discipline: Classics
- Sub-discipline: Linguistics
- Institutions: Allen University

Frazelia Campbell (March 18, 1849 – October 5, 1930) was an American classicist, linguist and teacher. She was featured in the "12 Black Classicists" travelling exhibition celebrating the achievements of African Americans working in Classical education.

== Early life ==
Frazelia Campbell was born in Charleston, South Carolina on 18 March 1849 to Frederick and Julia Swartz Campbell.

== Education ==
Campbell studied at Philadelphia's Institute for Colored Youth (ICY), graduating in 1867. The ICY was founded in 1839 by a Society of Friends which based its teaching on the classical curriculum. She was probably taught by Fanny Jackson Coppin, a graduate of Oberlin College and a campaigner for women's education who taught Greek, Latin, and Mathematics at the institute from 1865 and served as its Principal from 1869 to 1902. Campbell gave a paper titled "The Worth of Books" on the school's 1865 commencement program, and another in 1866 called "Sic Itur ad Astra." Two years later, in 1868, she presented her essay "Virgil and Grey" at the school's winter commencement. Her education did not end there as she further completed a summer school at the University of Pennsylvania in 1908.

== Career ==
After graduation, Campbell began working at the Institute for Colored Youth, teaching Latin, German, and Spanish. In 1876, she became the head of the women's department of the institute. In 1876, she became the principal of the Girls' High School at the institute. When the Institute discontinued its academic work in 1902, Campbell moved to a teaching post at Allen University in Columbia, South Carolina, a university founded to support the education of African American people. During her time at the Institute for Colored Youth and at Allen University, she published articles on a range of classical and educational topics in the African Methodist Episcopal Church Review. Campbell taught Latin, German and Spanish at Allen University until at least 1912; at some point after this she returned to Philadelphia.

== Death ==
Campbell remained in Philadelphia where she died in her home, 621 N. Fifty-Seven St. on 5 October 1930. She died at the age of 81 and is buried in a family plot in the Eden Cemetery. This is a burial ground chartered for and by blacks in 1902 in Delaware County, Pennsylvania.

== Notable works ==
One of her essays which concerned Tacitus' conception of Germanic women called 'Tacitus' German Women', was published in the African Methodist Episcopal Review. Her work cautioned young African-American girls against too ready an acceptance of the Germanic myth. Campbell disagreed with Elizabeth Cady Stanton, who linked the "present improved condition" of modern women to the "exalted sentiment for women which prevailed among the Germans during Tacitus' times." Her observations were also contrasted to those of Alexander Crummell, who wrote about the same topic a decade earlier.

== Legacy ==
Campbell is one of only two women, along with Helen Maria Chesnutt, to be featured in the '12 Black Classicists' exhibition, which celebrates the contributions of African Americans to Classical education in the 19th and early 20th centuries. She was also given an honorable mention in Lawson Andrew Scruggs' 19th century collection of distinctive Black Women.

== Select publications ==
- "Die Beiden Piccolomini," African Methodist Episcopal Church Review 1 (Jan., 1885), pp. 200–204
- "Tacitus' German Women," African Methodist Episcopal Church Review 2 (Oct., 1885), pp. 167–73
- "Milton's Satan," African Methodist Episcopal Church Review 7 (Oct., 1885), pp. 196–198
- "The Sixteenth Century in the Education of Modern Thought," African Methodist Episcopal Church Review 19 (July, 1903), pp. 31–40.
