= James Forten School =

School in Philadelphia, Pennsylvania

Coordinates: 39.9432°N 75.1523°W

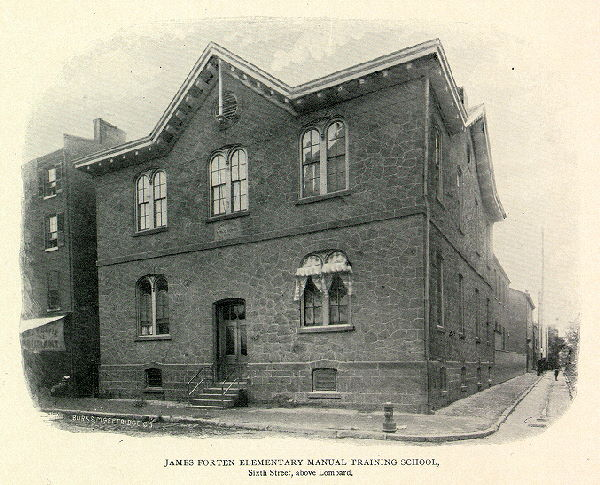
James Forten School drawn in 1896

James Forten School (1822–?), originally known as Mary Street School then Lombard Street Colored School and later Bird School or Mr. Bird's School, was the first public school for African Americans in Philadelphia, Pennsylvania.

== History ==
In the earliest years of the nineteenth century, Pennsylvania state laws affirmed the right of Black students to publicly funded, tuition-free schools, but those laws were ignored in Philadelphia until 1822. Facing pressure from elite white reformers in the Pennsylvania Abolition Society to open a school for Black children, city officials announced in April 1822 that "it is expedient that a school or schools be established for the free instruction of children of indigent coloured people."

On September 6, 1822, officials followed through by opening a school in an old Presbyterian church building on Mary Street, organized on the Lancasterian System. It opened with one teacher for 199 students, which rose to 237 by the end of 1823. The facilities at the school were crowded and not comparable to white schools in the city. Philadelphia's "colored" schools had only white teachers up until the Civil War era.

In 1828 the Mary Street school was moved to the Lombard Street school building and white students who had been there were relocated to a new school. James M. Bird served as principal and the school became known as Bird School or Bird's School. However, after Bird's transfer to a white school in 1833, the Lombard Street school fell into a period of disarray and neglect by officials, with half a dozen principals taking charge over the next five years. City officials also began to question the Lancasterian System and targeted the Lombard School for closure in 1840, which would have left Black Philadelphians without any grammar school in the city. In response, the prominent Black Philadelphian James Forten and members of the Pennsylvania Abolition Society successfully petitioned school officials to keep the Lombard School open and bring Bird back.

By 1854 Maria C. Hutton was serving as principal of the girls school.

The school was eventually renamed for prominent African American businessman, abolitionist, and civil rights activist James Forten. It was located at Sixth Street and Lombard Street.

In 1869 it was rebuilt and in 1897 the school was renovated and reopened as the James Forten Elementary Manual Training School. Manual training was taught at the school which saw increasing enrollment by immigrants. Many of the immigrants were Russian Jews.

== Alumni ==
- Octavius Catto
- James Mara Adger
- Joseph E. Lee

== See also ==
- Institute for Colored Youth, a public high school for African Americans in Philadelphia
- Roberts Vaux Junior High School
