= Helen Maria Chesnutt =

African American teacher of Latin, text-book author

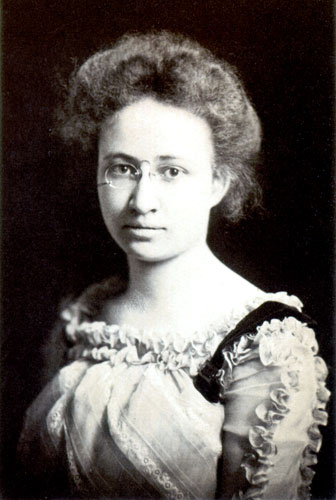
- Born: December 6, 1880
- Died: August 7, 1969 (aged 88)
- Education: Smith College
- Occupations: Teacher, author, classical scholar
- Father: Charles W. Chesnutt

Helen Maria Chesnutt (December 6, 1880 – August 7, 1969) was an American teacher of Latin and the author of an influential biographies and Latin text books. She was African American.

== Family life ==
Helen Maria Chesnutt was born in Fayetteville, North Carolina in 1880. Her parents were the author Charles Chesnutt, said to be the first important black American novelist, and Susan Perry.

== Education ==
Helen Maria Chesnutt attended Smith College with her sister Ethel, living off-campus as did Otelia Cromwell, the only other black student attending Smith College at this time. The Chesnutt sisters moved to four different addresses during their time at Smith: boarding houses at 95 West Street (1st year), 10 Green Street (2nd year), 36 Green Street (3rd year), and as seniors at 30 Green Street.

A diary entry by English Professor Mary Jordan gives a glimpse of the sisters' experiences at Smith College, which appear not to have been happy. She wrote that the "Chesnutt girls are having a hard time with the color line...".

In 1902 Helen Chesnutt graduated with a B.A. from Smith College, only a year after Otelia Cromwell became the college's first African American graduate, but it was not until 1925 that she would earn an M.A. in Latin from Columbia University.

== Career and wider influence ==
Helen Chesnutt taught Latin for many years at Central High School in Cleveland, Ohio, including to the poet Langston Hughes, who found her inspiring. For Virgil's 2,000th birthday she put on a play involving the whole school and published a report of the production in the Classical Journal. She said that: "Roman costumes were gay in color, a fact which seemed to surprise the pupils, who were accustomed to think of them as made of white marble. The dresses and scarfs and tunics had to be dyed, and so the laundry classes spent some days in dyeing and tinting the garments. Their great achievement was a royal toga for Augustus to wear, dyed a perfect Roman purple and stenciled in gold."

"During that hour the pupils of this cosmopolitan high school, situated in the downtown district of a great city, hemmed in on all sides by acres of scrapped automobiles rusting in heaps, and enveloped by the smoke and grime of a great railroad system not far distant, in a neighborhood where the guns of gangsters can be heard roaring day and night, were transported to another age, walked hand in hand with beauty and romance, and were made to feel that poetry and music and art were precious and that human aspiration was indeed worth while. This is what the celebration of the Bimillennium Vergilianum did for the two thousand pupils of this high school, and they have drunk a draft of inspiration that will remain with them forever."

She co-authored, with Martha Olivenbaum and Nellie Rosebaugh, a beginners Latin textbook entitled The Road to Latin (1932), which was published in 1932, republished in 1938, 1945 and 1949, and received several positive reviews. The book and teaching methods, which relied on oral presentation of Latin, intensive rather than extensive reading, and a paraphrase method, were discussed and appraised positively in research into teaching of Latin in the US at that time. One reviewer noted that original edition had a "plain cover, on which the title is lettered in black together with a cameo-like oval in gilt showing a slave taking two Roman boys to school."

Helen Chesnutt was elected to the executive committee of the American Philological Association in 1920, remaining an active member until 1934.

Charles Waddell Chesnutt: Pioneer of the Color Line, her biography of her father Charles Chesnutt published in 1952, remains an important source of information about this novel and short story author.

In 2018 she featured in an exhibition at the Center for Hellenic Studies in Washington DC celebrating the role of African Americans within classics, whose important contributions to the discipline have often been ignored by historians. She was one of only two women to feature in the exhibition, the other of whom is Frazelia Campbell.
