= Philadelphia Pythians =

Negro league baseball club (1865–1871)

Information
- League: Independent (1865–1871)
- Location: Philadelphia, Pennsylvania
- Ballpark: Recreation Park (1865–1871)
- Established: 1865
- Disbanded: 1871

The Philadelphia Pythians (also Pythian Base Ball Club, Pythian Baseball Club, or the "Pyths") was one of the earliest Negro league baseball clubs, founded in 1865. African-American leaders Jacob C. White Jr. and Octavius V. Catto established the team. The Pythians were composed of primarily business and middle class professionals from the surrounding areas of Washington, D.C., Philadelphia, and New York City. Just two years after the Civil War ended, in 1867, the Pennsylvania State Convention of Baseball, located in Harrisburg, denied the "Pythian Base Ball Club" out of Philadelphia. The team dissolved after Catto's death in 1871 and a new team formed under the Pythian name in the National Colored Base Ball League in 1887. The new team's first season went 4–1. Due to financial troubles it folded after only one season.

== Founders ==
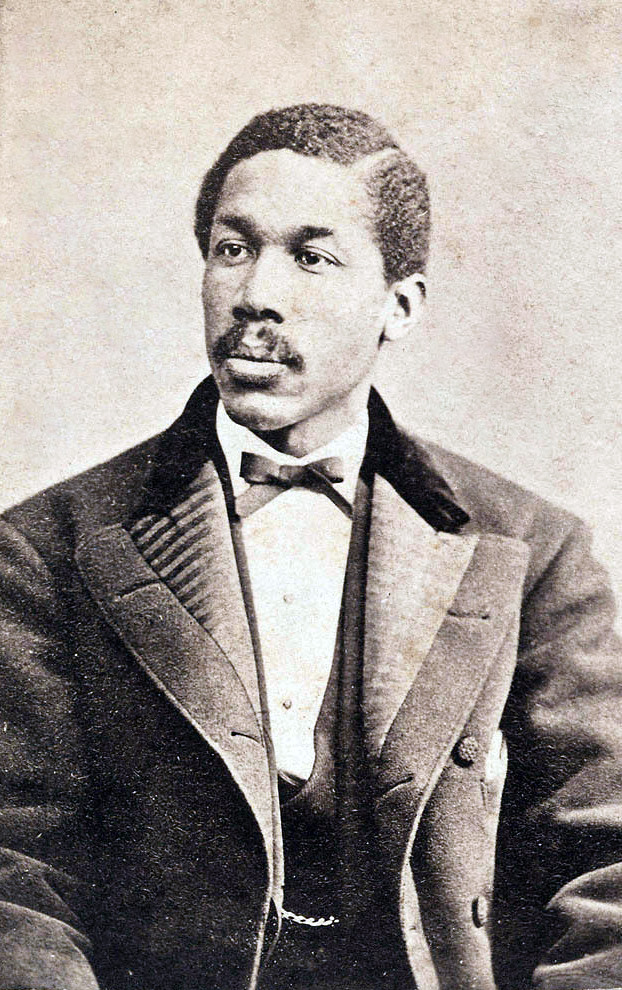
Photograph of Octavius V. Catto

Octavius V. Catto and Jacob C. White, two graduates from the Institute for Colored Youth, believed baseball was another way in which African Americans could assert their skills and independence, and prove their right to full citizenship and equality. Incidentally the two had originally played cricket at the institute, but switched to baseball for an unknown reason. They had been childhood friends and they emerged as prominent figures in Philadelphia's African American community.

Catto entered politics with the hope of aiding black civil liberties and led efforts to gain equality and equal access to public programs. This continued until Catto's murder at the hands of Frank Kelly in 1871 during an attack on black voters by Democrats.

Prior to the American Civil War, professional baseball has been denied to African Americans. Black leaders considered baseball a route to American cultural assimilation, and following the Civil War, Negro baseball grew exponentially. Octavius Catto pioneered the racial shift in baseball. Many of the players were Institute for Colored Youth graduates. These men belonged to the Knights of Pythias of North America, South America, Europe, Asia, Africa and Australia, an African Americanfraternal organization, which helped pay for baseball supplies. A third, lesser-known founding member was William Still. Still was a local coal dealer and civil rights activist; this played into the Pythians' idea of using the baseball to achieve equality.

== History ==
The team was originally known as the Independent Ball Club, a team of the Institute for Colored Youth. Due to the number members who belonged to the Knights of Pythias of North America, South America, Europe, Asia, Africa and Australia, the team was renamed the Pythians. The first full season took place in 1867 under Catto's leadership. Their first game was played at Diamond Cottage Park in Camden, New Jersey, because the team could not gain access to the Parade Grounds at 11th and Wharton in Philadelphia. The team played their home games at Fairmount Park, but they used Liberty Hall of the Institute for Colored Youth as their club house. This is where the team met to socialize and plan game strategies. The Pythians believed that credibility and acceptance could be promoted by competing against "our white brethren" on a baseball diamond.

In September 1869, the Pythians played against the all white Olympics; likely the first recorded instance of an interracial baseball game. Although the Pythians lost 44–23, the September 4th edition of the Philadelphia Inquirer covered the game inning for inning, noting the skill of the Pythians as well as the large size of the crowd. A few days later the Pythians played and beat the all-white Philadelphia City Items; a historic victory that Catto hoped would prove the capability of African Americans. These game were successful in drawing large crowds and praise from news outlets for the Pythians' respectable play. In the years following the number of games per season was greatly reduced. This was in part due to raising racial tensions. The passage of the Fifteenth Amendment in 1870 led to the assassination of Catto during the election of 1871. The team was unable to continue its efforts without its charismatic leader and folded shortly after.

== Players and schedule (1868) ==
The 1868 season was the most notable for the Pythians. Records of the team's undefeated season show the player roster and the schedule. The team had three separate lineups, also known as a "nine". A handwritten copy of the 1868 roster reveals the players for each lineup. The schedule also shows their non-league games and scores.

First Nine: Jefferson Cavens (First Basemen), John Cannon (Pitcher), Frank J.R. Jones (Third Basemen), John Graham (Outfielder/Catcher), James Sparrow (Shortstop), Spencer Hanly (Outfielder/Catcher), Joshua Adkins (Third Basemen), Octavius V. Catto (Second Baseman/Shortstop/Captain)

Second Nine: Raymond J. Burr, Andrew J. Jones, Frederick Walker, Richard E.F., David Knight, Edwin C. Vidal, Charles M. Thomas, James Ash, Henry Price, James Jenkins

Third Nine John H. Davis, Joseph J. Minton, William T. Jones, Jacob C. White Jr., Harry Francis, Edward M. Bassett, William H. Minton, Henry Boyer, Thomas Jones, Jacob R. Ballard, Thaddeus Manning

1868 Schedule

Date	Opponent	Score	Result
August 21	Blue Sky	26–12	Win
August 24	Active of West Chester	31–9	Win
September 5	"	30–30	Tie
October 1	Mutual Washington	49–33	Win
October 3	Alert "	40–34	Win
October 6	Monitors Brooklyn	27–9	Win
October 10	Monrovia Harrisburg	71–16	Win

Note: The team names are as they appear on the handwritten schedule. Furthermore, baseball games at this time could also end in a tie.

== Formalization of the color line ==
The Pythians were refused membership in the National Association of Base Ball Players based on their race. Although the Pythians were nominated for membership by the vice-president of the Athletics ball club, E. Hicks Hayhurst, the NABBP banned "the admission of any club which may be composed of one or more colored persons." The association feared divisions among players if colored clubs were admitted. The ultimate reason the NABBP rejected Pythians has been debated by historians. Most scholars attribute it as racism on the part of the NABBP. Others have cited at this is an oversimplification and that the reason could have been a fear of controversy for admitting a negro team or for financial reasons. Ultimately, this set the precedent for segregated Major Leagues and independent leagues which continued into the twentieth century. Therefore, the club was the first to attempt to integrate African American males into a segregated baseball league. By 1871, the NABBP dissolved and the team was no longer restricted by its rules. Ultimately the U.S. Supreme Court made the decision to sanction racial segregation in United States including baseball, through its 1896 Plessy v. Ferguson decision.
