= Hugh M. Browne =

American educator, civil rights activist, and inventor

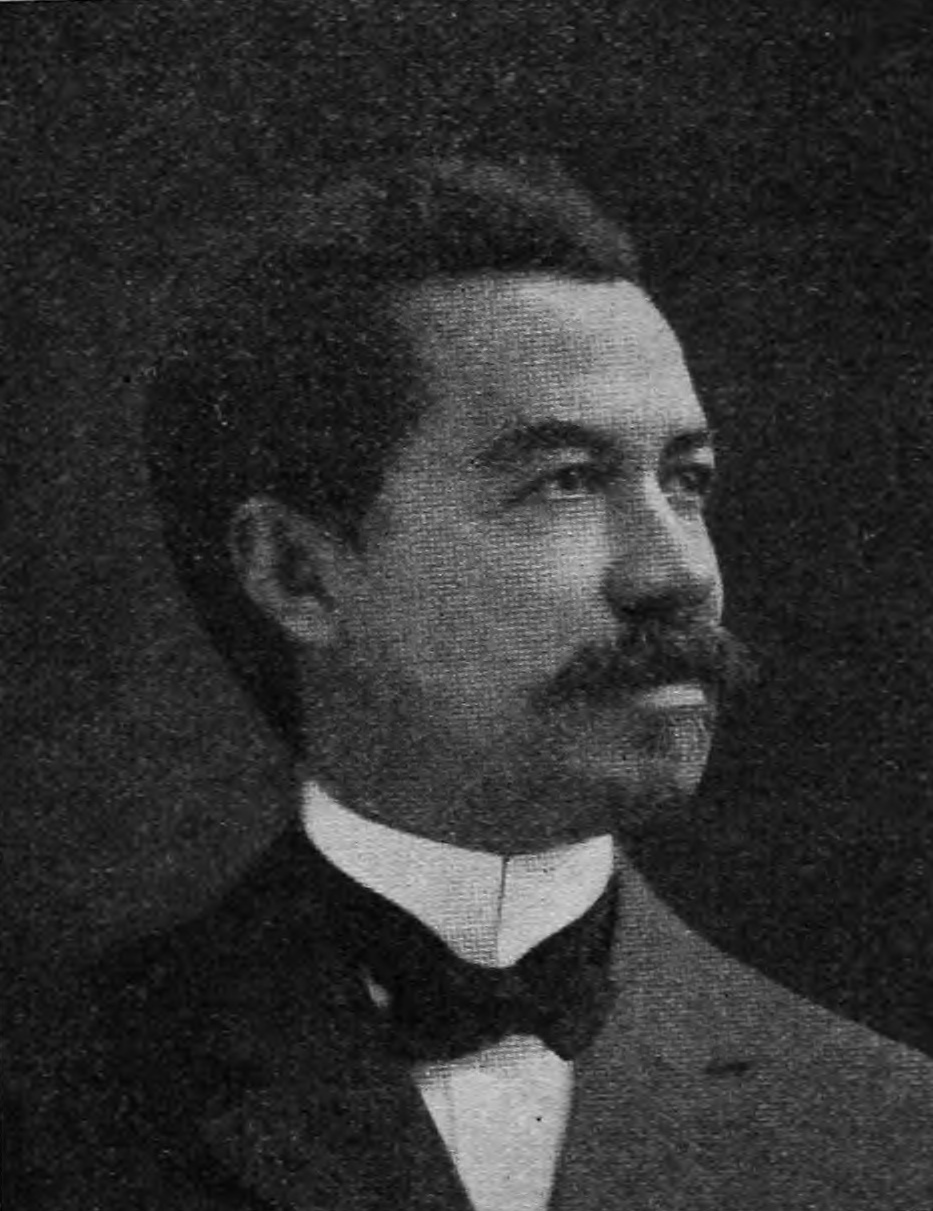
- Born: Hugh Mason Browne; June 12, 1851; Washington, D.C., US
- Died: October 30, 1923 (aged 72); Washington, D.C.
- Education: Howard University, Princeton Theological Seminary
- Occupations: Educator, civil rights activist, inventor
- Known for: Principal of the Institute for Colored Youth

Hugh Mason Browne (1851–1923) was an American educator and civil rights activist who served as principal of the Institute for Colored Youth (now the Cheyney University of Pennsylvania) from 1902 to 1913. Browne was born and raised in Washington, D. C., and attended public schools before entering Howard University. After graduating from Howard, Browne attended Princeton Theological Seminary, graduating in 1878. Browne later taught at Liberia College and Hampton University. A proponent of vocational education who was active in the NAACP and philosophically aligned with Booker T. Washington, Browne oversaw the move of the Institute for Colored Youth from urban Philadelphia to rural Cheyney and founded a teacher training school at the new location. He invented a device to stop wastewater from flowing back into homes, receiving a patent for his invention on April 29, 1890.
