= Roberts Vaux =

American judge

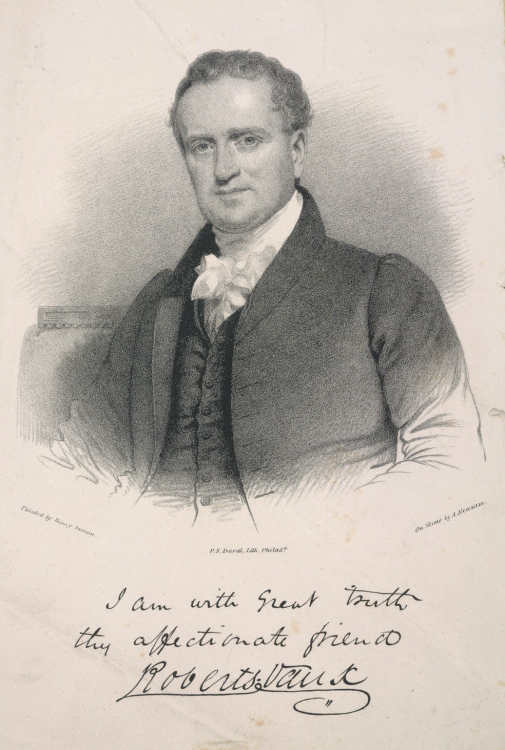
- Born: January 25, 1786; Philadelphia
- Died: January 7, 1836 (aged 49); Philadelphia
- Occupation: Jurist

Roberts Vaux (January 25, 1786 – January 7, 1836) was an American lawyer, jurist, abolitionist, and philanthropist.

== Early life ==
He was born in Philadelphia, Pennsylvania, the eldest son of a well-known Quaker family (Richard and Anne Roberts Vaux) and connected by marriage to another such family, the Wistars. He received his education at private schools of Philadelphia.

== Career ==
Vaux was admitted to the bar in 1808, and rose rapidly to prominence in his profession, although he only became judge of the court of common pleas of Philadelphia about a year before his death. Embodying the Quaker values of morality and public service, Vaux helped found Pennsylvania's public-school system (and for fourteen years held the first presidency of the board of public schools of Philadelphia), and at one time was a member of more than fifty philanthropic societies.

Vaux became noted for his interest in abolition, as well as Native American issues. He helped found the Pennsylvania Institution for the Deaf and Dumb, the School for the Blind, the Philadelphia Savings Fund Society, the Historical Society of Pennsylvania, and other benevolent societies of the city and state. Vaux also had a part in the creation of the Frankford Asylum for the Insane (now known as Friends Hospital). He was a member of scientific societies in Europe, and of the American Philosophical Society (elected in 1819). He was elected a member of the American Antiquarian Society in 1834.

Early in life, Vaux became interested in prison matters, as an extension of his education concerns. He acquired perhaps his greatest distinction as a penologist. He served as Secretary and Commissioner of the Philadelphia Prison Society. He was one of the commissioners to adapt the law of Pennsylvania to the separate system of imprisonment, and also to build the Eastern State Penitentiary, and labored zealously in the cause of prison reform. He was among those Alexis de Tocqueville dedicated his book on prison reform after his travels across the United States including Philadelphia.

Vaux refused several public posts offered by President Andrew Jackson, among which was the mission to St. Petersburg. He published Eulogium on Benjamin Ridgway Smith (Philadelphia, 1809); Memoirs of the Lives of Benjamin Lay and Ralph Sandiford (1815); Memoirs of the Life of Anthony Benezet (1817; with alterations, York, 1817; French translation, Paris, 1821); and Notices of the Original and Successive Efforts to improve the Discipline of the Prison at Philadelphia (1826).

== Family ==
Vaux married Margaret Wistar in 1814. They had two sons, Richard and Thomas, who survived their parents and are buried at Laurel Hill Cemetery in Philadelphia. Richard Vaux (1816–95) became mayor of Philadelphia and a member of the U.S. House of Representatives from Pennsylvania.

== Death ==
Vaux died in Philadelphia on January 7, 1836, at age 49, of scarlet fever. He was buried at the Arch Street Friends Meeting House burial ground.

== Legacy ==
Vaux is the namesake of the Roberts Vaux Junior High School in Philadelphia, built during the Great Depression as a high school and later converted to a junior high school and private academy. It was added to the National Register of Historic Places in 1988 and closed in June 2013
