= William Nesbit (activist) =

American civic leader and lobbyist (1822–1895)

William Nesbit (October 11, 1822 – October 26, 1895) was an African American civic leader in Altoona, Pennsylvania and an instrumental lobbyist for the Fourteenth Amendment to the United States Constitution.

== Career ==
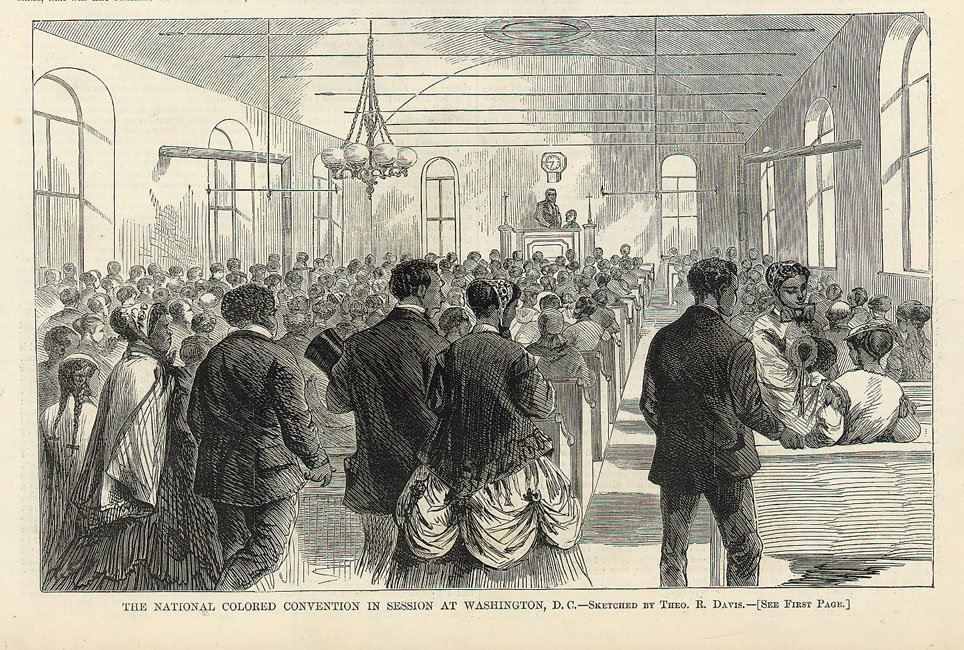
"The National Colored Convention in Session at Washington, DC." Harper's Weekly (February 6, 1869)

After visiting Liberia in 1853 on the Isla de Cuba, Nesbit became vocally critical of colonizing Liberia. He describes his experiences and observations in colonial Liberia in a pamphlet he wrote in 1855 entitled "Four Months in Liberia, Or, African Colonization Exposed."

The statements generally circulated in this country by the Colonization agents, respecting the thrift and prosperity of that country, are most egregious falsehoods. Everything is exaggerated.

— William Nesbit, "Four Months in Liberia, Or, African Colonization Exposed"

Nesbit was active in the Altoona community, serving as a Notary Public and acting as a Blair County, Pennsylvania Republican candidate to the Pennsylvania state convention.

Nesbit served as the first president of The Pennsylvania State Equal Rights League, a chapter of the National Equal Rights League. In this capacity, he successfully lobbied US Congress with congressional allies Charles Sumner, William Kelley and Thaddeus Stevens into passing the Fourteenth Amendment in 1868. He organized a number of National Colored Conventions in Washington, D.C. to rally against "partial or total exclusion of colored citizens of the elective franchise and other citizen rights, in so many States of the Union."

By 1870, he was once again engaged in his original trade as a barber.

== Family ==
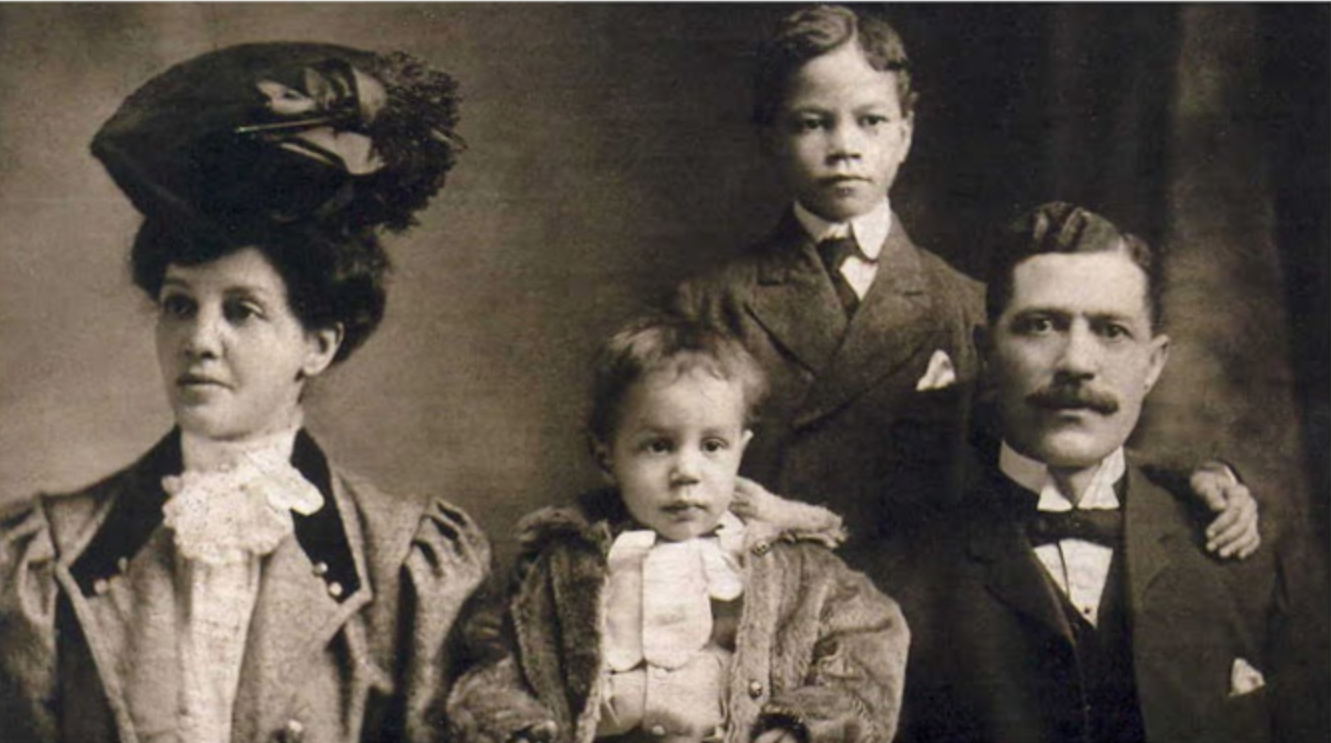
William Nesbit's son, Charles H. Nesbit of Altoona, Pennsylvania, and his family. Grandson William C. Nesbit is on the top right.

William Nesbit and wife Sarah née Thomas (1815 - 1888) had five children. His son Charles followed in his footsteps and became a local barber.

Nesbit's grandson, Sergeant William C. Nesbit of the 24th Infantry Regiment (United States), participated in the Houston riot of 1917 precipitated by Jim Crow laws and clashes between the Houston, Texas police and the all-black regiment. He was court-martialed and executed.

== Death ==
Nesbit died in 1895 at the age of 73 due to pneumonia.

William Nesbit, one of the most prominent colored men of the county, died at his home in Altoona Saturday morning. He was aged about 73 years. His entire life was given to the elevation of his race. He was a man of strong character and the influence of his good judgment extended beyond the ranks of his own people. His death will be regretted by all who were so fortunate as to have his acquaintance.

— Tyrone Daily Herald, 28 October 1895
