= Nathaniel Booth (slave) =

Escaped African-American slave (1826–1901)

Nathaniel Booth (1826 – 1901 in Philadelphia, Pennsylvania) was an African American who escaped from slavery.

== Escape from slavery ==
Nathaniel Booth was born a slave on a Virginia plantation in February 1826. At the age of 17 Booth escaped and sought freedom in the North. Arriving about 1844, he settled in Lowell, Massachusetts, and opened a barbershop on the first floor of the Middlesex Mechanics Association Block located on Dutton Street. In 1849, Edwin Moore (also an escaped slave from Virginia) joined Booth in business as hairdressers. It was not unusual for African American barbers and hairdressers in New England to be active in abolitionism and the American Anti-Slavery Society. Their barbershops were often gathering places for black and white abolitionist organizing efforts to end slavery. Together, they planned fundraising fairs, arranged visiting anti-slavery lectures, and help escaped slaves.

== Slave catchers ==
Shortly after the Fugitive Slave Act of 1850 was passed by Congress, "one or two slave catchers" were seen in Lowell; as a result Nathaniel Booth fled to Canada. Immediately and publicly the local Free Soil Party pleaded with Booth to return to Lowell, offering him full protection. One member expressing "a willingness to suffer death rather than let a fugitive slave be caught when it was within his power to prevent it." Shortly after this announcement, Booth returned to Lowell and moved in with the Walker Lewis Family, a family of free African Americans living and working in Lowell and active in the Massachusetts anti-slavery movement and the local Underground Railroad. One year later in 1851, slave catchers were again in Lowell and discovered Booth and demanded that he be returned to his southern plantation owner. In response, Linus Child, Agent/CEO of the Boott Cotton Mill stepped forward and negotiated the price of Booth's freedom from $1,500 to $750. Child then raised the needed money from the local community to complete the purchase of Nathaniel Booth's freedom. As a free man, Booth continued to live and work in Lowell. In 1855, the Massachusetts Legislature passed the comprehensive Personal liberty laws, which practically nullified the Fugitive Slave Act of 1850. The South viewed this action as defying the Federal Constitution, and tensions between the North and the South grew.

== Post freedom ==
In the late 1850s, Nathaniel Booth moved to Boston, Massachusetts. On a trip to Philadelphia, Pennsylvania, where he met Frances 'Fanny' LeCount Johnson, a member of a prominent African American family, including cousin Caroline LeCount. On August 24, 1858, they married in Philadelphia. In 1859, he returned to Boston with his wife, where he operated a barbershop. While living in Boston, residing in his home was Henry Williams' Family who had escaped from slavery in Virginia, including Mary Mildred Williams. After the Civil War, Nathaniel, Fanny, and their three oldest Boston born daughters Ida J. Booth; Mary LeCount Booth; and Ellen Frances Booth moved back to Philadelphia. In Philadelphia, seven more children were born (Walter Proctor Booth; Bertha Lydia Booth; Nathaniel Booth, Jr.; Guy Bryan Booth; Blanche Julia Hamilton Booth; Daisy Natalie Booth; and Robert Guernsey Booth).

== See also ==
- American slave court cases
- History of slavery in Massachusetts
- History of slavery in the United States
- List of African-American abolitionists
- List of notable opponents of slavery
- List of enslaved people
- Slave narrative
- Caroline LeCount
