= Roberts Vaux Junior High School =

- The Promise Academy at Roberts Vaux High School
- U.S. National Register of Historic Places
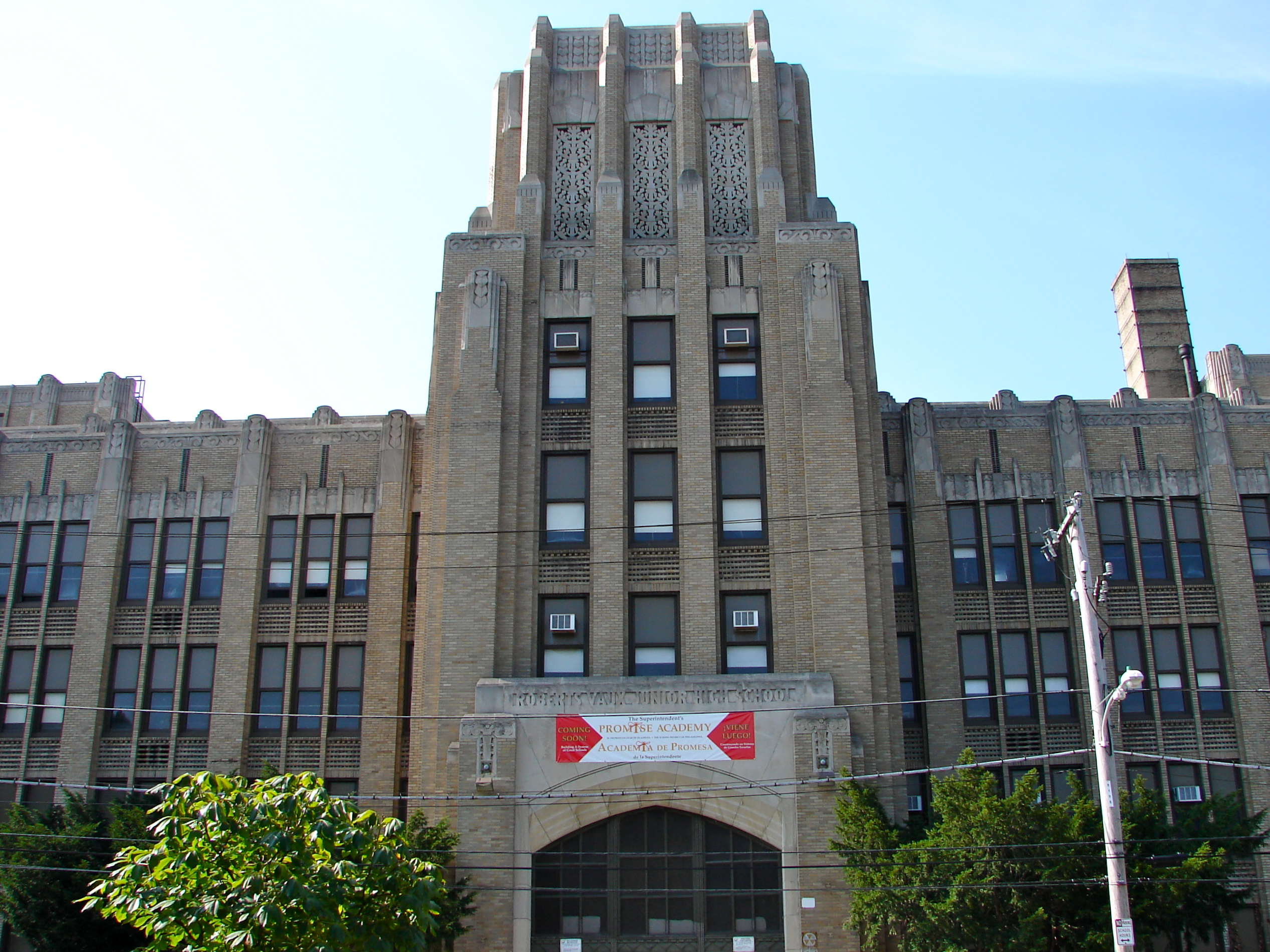
- Roberts Vaux High School, August 2010

- Location within Philadelphia Location within Pennsylvania Location within the United States
- Location: 230-2344 W. Master St., Philadelphia, Pennsylvania
- Coordinates: 39°58′34″N 75°10′29″W
- Area: 2 acres (0.81 ha)
- Built: 1936-1938
- Architect: Catharine, Irwin T.
- Architectural style: Moderne, Art Deco
- MPS: Philadelphia Public Schools TR
- NRHP reference No.: 88002332
- Added to NRHP: November 18, 1988

The Promise Academy at Roberts Vaux High School (commonly referred to as the Roberts Vaux Promise Academy) is a historic American high school in the North Central neighborhood of Philadelphia, Pennsylvania.

Named for American jurist, abolitionist, and philanthropist Roberts Vaux (1786-1836), it was added to the National Register of Historic Places in 1988.

== History and architectural features ==
Designed by Irwin T. Catharine and built between 1936 and 1938, this historic structure is a four-story, twenty-three-bay, U-shaped, yellow brick building that was created in a Moderne/Art Deco style. It features projecting end pavilions, terra cotta decorative work, and a two-story, stone, Tudor-arched entryway.

It was named for American jurist, abolitionist, and philanthropist Roberts Vaux (1786-1836). Jacob C. White, Jr. served as principal from 1864 to 1896 and was the first black school principal in Philadelphia. During his tenure, White reformed the institute and became the leading figure in the field of urban education in Philadelphia.

From 1977-1983, Vaux Junior High's chess team, the Bad Bishops, won an unprecedented seven consecutive national junior high school chess championships. In 1979 the Bad Bishops were invited to a tournament in Yugoslavia by the Belgrade Chess Association. They were also invited to the White House on May 3, prior to their international trip. Vaux produced a number of successful chess players, including NM Howard Daniels, who held the record for the youngest Black chess master for 25 years. The team was initially coached by Michael Sherman, then by mathematics teacher Jeff Chesin. The team disbanded when Chesin left for another school. It was then resurrected during the 1990s by special education teacher Salome Thomas-El who later became the school's principal. During the early 2000s, the chess program disbanded again.

While teaching at Vaux High in North Philadelphia during the 2000s, rugby player Larry Conlan saw a need for his students to positively channel their aggression and started an after-school rugby club in 2012.

Added to the National Register of Historic Places in 1988, the school was closed in 2013 as part of Philadelphia's shutdown of twenty-three district-run schools. Displaced students were enrolled in Strawberry Mansion High School and Benjamin Franklin High School. The school then reopened for the 2017–2018 academic year under the new leadership of Big Picture Philadelphia.
