= Institute for Colored Youth =

Former high school for African-Americans in Philadelphia

- U.S. National Register of Historic Places
- Pennsylvania state historical marker
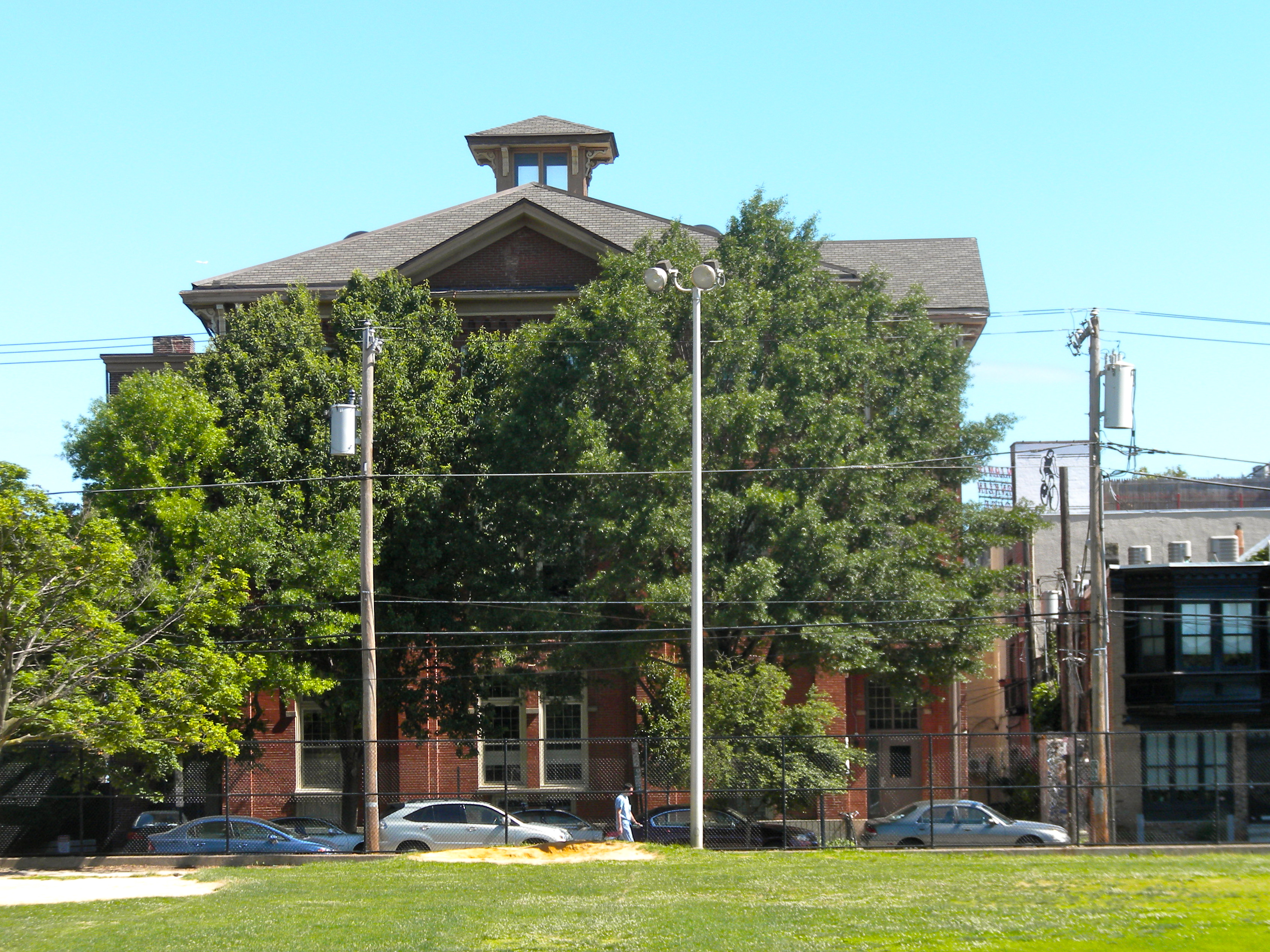

- Location within Philadelphia Location within Pennsylvania Location within the United States
- Location: 915 Bainbridge St., Philadelphia, Pennsylvania
- Coordinates: 39.9420°N 75.1579°W
- Architect: Edward Fay
- Architectural style: Italianate
- MPS: Philadelphia Public Schools TR
- NRHP reference No.: 86003324

Significant dates
- Added to NRHP: December 4, 1986
- Designated PHMC: 1991

The Institute for Colored Youth was founded in 1837 in Philadelphia, Pennsylvania, United States. It became the first college for African-Americans in the United States, although there were schools that admitted African Americans preceding it. At the time, public policy and certain statutory provisions prohibited the education of blacks in various parts of the nation and slavery was entrenched across the south. It was followed by two other black institutions— Lincoln University in Pennsylvania (1854), and Wilberforce University in Ohio (1856). The second site of the Institute for Colored Youth at Ninth and Bainbridge Streets in Philadelphia was added to the National Register of Historic Places in 1986. It is also known as the Samuel J. Randall School. A three-story, three-bay brick building was built for it in 1865, in the Italianate-style After moving to Cheyney, Pennsylvania in Delaware County, Pennsylvania its name was changed to Cheyney University.

== History ==
The Institute was founded as the African Institute by Richard Humphreys, a Quaker philanthropist who bequeathed $10,000, one-tenth of his estate, to design and establish a school to educate people of African descent. Born on a plantation in the West Indies, Humphreys came to Philadelphia in 1764, where he became concerned about the struggles of free African Americans to make a living. News of the Cincinnati riots of 1829 prompted Humphreys to write his will, in which he charged thirteen fellow Quakers to design an institution "to instruct the descendants of the African Race in school learning, in the various branches of the mechanic Arts, trades and Agriculture, in order to prepare and fit and qualify them to act as teachers...."

Using the money Humphreys bequeathed, the Quakers formed an organization in 1837. The school was soon renamed the Institute for Colored Youth. For several years, they experimented with agricultural and industrial education, as well as trade apprenticeships for African-American children. By 1851, the Managers, as the Quakers came to be called, instead decided to focus on Humphreys's wish to train African-American children to become teachers. In 1852, the Managers opened the first Institute for Colored Youth building at 716–718 Lombard Street in Philadelphia. Grace A. Mapps was appointed head of the 'Female Department'.

The Noyes Academy in New Hampshire preceded it and there had been efforts to establish a college for African Americans in New Haven, Connecticut but efforts to form the college were stopped by opposition from whites and the school was destroyed in mob attacks. Prudence Crandall was not allowed to admit an African American girl to her Canterbury Female Boarding School. She converted the boarding school to one for only African American girls, but was jailed for her efforts and a Black Law was passed in the state. The school closed after mob attacks.

Although operated by the Quaker Board of Managers, the faculty of the Institute for Colored Youth were entirely African-American men and women. The Institute contained both Boys' and Girls' High Schools, as well as a Preparatory School (sometimes known as the Brown Preparatory School). The school provided a classical education to young African Americans in Philadelphia, with a curriculum including advanced mathematics, sciences, English, philosophy, various social sciences, and classical languages.

== Development ==
Ebenezer Don Carlos Bassett, who later served as United States Ambassador to Haiti from 1869 to 1877, was the school's principal from 1857 to 1869.

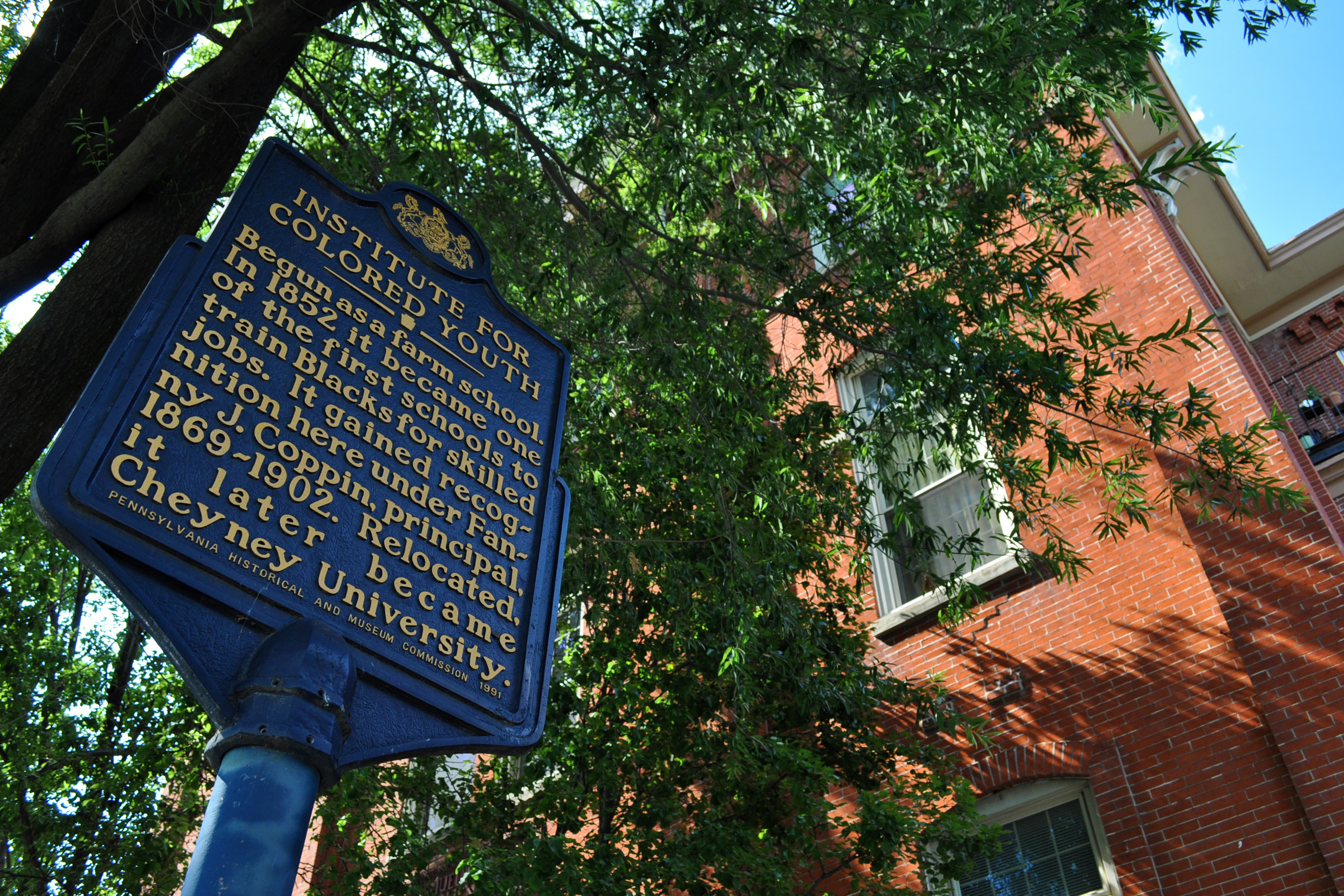
Institute for Colored Youth Building Historical Marker

By 1861, the Managers recognized a need for a better facility for their growing school. After an extensive fundraising campaign, the Managers purchased a lot at 915 Bainbridge Street. The new Institute for Colored Youth building opened on March 9, 1866. It was capable of holding twice as many students as the original school and had facilities such as a lecture hall and chemistry laboratory.

== Move to Cheyney ==
In 1902, under the leadership of newly appointed principal Hugh M. Browne, the Institute moved to George Cheyney's farm, 25 miles (40 km) west of Philadelphia, and afterward the name "Cheyney" became associated with the school.

At the same time the all-white board eliminated the collegial program, fired all the teachers (including Edward Bouchet) and replaced them with instructors who followed Booker T. Washington's doctrine of industrial education.

== Current use ==
The Randall School House is now used as condos.

== Notable alumni ==
=== Academics ===
- Frazelia Campbell
- James B. Dudley

=== Artists ===
- Robert Douglass Jr.
- Sarah Mapps Douglass

=== Educators ===
- Lucy Addison
- James M. Baxter
- Octavius Valentine Catto
- Jacob C. White Jr.
- Caroline LeCount

=== Miscellaneous ===
- Julian F. Abele, architect
- Rebecca Cole, physician
- John Wesley Cromwell, lawyer
- Emilie Davis, diarist
- John H. Smythe, diplomat
- Josephine Silone Yates, chemist
