= 33rd Street (Baltimore) =

Street in Baltimore, Maryland

- Interactive map of 33rd Street
- Owner: City of Baltimore
- Location: Baltimore
- Postal code: 21211, 21218
- West end: North Charles Street
- East end: Hillen Road

33rd Street, originally called Thirty-third Street Boulevard, is a long, wide, east–west parkway with a broad tree-shaded median strip. It is surrounded by 1920s-era "Daylight-styled" row houses with porches and small front yards. It was designed by the Frederick Law Olmsted Brothers firm, as part of their Baltimore Plan of 1904 and 1921 for establishing stream valley parks and connecting boulevards.

33rd Street is designated as "East" and "West" 33rd: the Johns Hopkins University campus and Wyman Park separate West 33rd — a six-block-long residential street which runs from Beach Avenue at the east to Falls Cliff Road at the west — from the main part of the street, East 33rd.

The street is served by part of the MTA bus routes 3 and 22.

== Current Landmarks ==
=== The Johns Hopkins University ===
33rd Street is bisected by The Johns Hopkins University "Homewood" campus. a notable institution of American higher education, considered to be the first modern university in the country. Founded 1876, Hopkins is particularly renowned for its student research program and The Johns Hopkins Hospital, a teaching hospital founded 1889 and School of Medicine, established 1893, in East Baltimore, both affiliated with the university. Johns Hopkins also occupies the building further east along 33rd Street, at Loch Raven Boulevard, formerly used by all-girls Eastern High School, founded 1844 until closed in 1986: a large, H-shaped, red brick, English Tudor Revival/Jacobethan styled building with limestone trim, constructed 1936–1938, matching a similar twin structure for the also still all-female Western High School on the westside on Gwynns Falls Parkway, built a decade earlier.

=== The Baltimore City College ===
On the south side of 33rd street, between Loch Raven Boulevard and The Alameda, is The Baltimore City College. It is a formerly all-boys, but now coeducational (since 1979) magnet public high school, the third oldest public secondary school in America (founded 1839 on former Courtland Street in downtown Baltimore, and eventually relocated to the 33rd Street building, its eighth location, nicknamed "The Castle on the Hill" in 1928). City College is a massive stone structure, with a 150-foot bell tower in the Collegiate Gothic Revival style architecture. A historic and architectural landmark and the capstone of the Baltimore City Public Schools system, the City College boasts many famous successful alumni and distinguished faculty.

The academic campus on "Collegian Hill" replaced '"Abbottston'" in 1926–1928, the 1870s Victorian-era mansion and hilltop estate of Horace Abbott (1806-1887), the Canton waterfront iron works/foundry owner from the American Civil War era of 1861–1865. When later inherited by his married daughter after his death, the mansion was known as the Gilman-Cate estate. The well known foundry which supplied material for the revolutionary new ironclad warships of the Union Navy, was located at Boston and Hudson Streets.

=== Lake Montebello ===
33rd Street ends at Hillen Road and Lake Montebello, an oval artificial retention pond with a surrounding decorative iron-bar fence that is part of the Baltimore City and surrounding Baltimore County and Anne Arundel County metropolitan public water system. The lake is fed by underground conduits from Loch Raven Reservoir, several miles north and the adjacent Montebello Water Filtration Plant, of Italianate style in dark red brick and green tile roofs built 1913.

== Former Landmarks ==
=== Stadiums ===
33rd Street passes to the north of an area where two historic stadiums were built in succession. In 1922, Municipal Stadium (also known as "Baltimore Stadium" and "Venerable Stadium") was built as a football only bowl on the site of the former larger Venable Park. Municipal Stadium was later only 27 years later, demolished in 1949, and the following year (1950) Memorial Stadium was beginning reconstruction and built in its place with an added upper deck, completed in 1954 for both football and baseball. Memorial Stadium was demolished in 2002.

While these stadiums were active, the name "33rd Street" was synonymous with the professional sports teams that played in this northeast Baltimore neighborhood between Waverly to the west and Coldstream-Homestead-Montebello to the east, and Ednor Gardens-Lakeside to the north, being the homes of major league baseball's Baltimore Orioles (1954 to 1991), the National Football League's Baltimore Colts (1950 and 1953–1983), the Canadian Football League's Baltimore Stallions (1994 & 1995) and the NFL's Baltimore Ravens (1996 & 1997).

Old Municipal and successor Memorial Stadiums also served as an occasional high school and college football "home" venue for the Terrapins of the University of Maryland at College Park, the Midshipmen of the U.S. Naval Academy at Annapolis (including hosting the Navy–Notre Dame football rivalry and the Army–Navy Game multiple times), and the Bears of nearby Morgan State University.

33rd Street was also home to two of the nation's oldest high school football rivalries, with the annual "Turkey Bowl" (Calvert Hall College vs. Loyola Blakefield / Loyola High School) and "City-Poly Game" (Baltimore City College vs. Baltimore Polytechnic Institute) played each year on Thanksgiving Day at Memorial Stadium.

The section of 33rd Street in front of the stadium was renamed "Babe Ruth Plaza" in honor of famous Baltimore baseball player George Herman ("Babe") Ruth (1895-1948), who played for the Baltimore Orioles, Boston Red Sox, and finally New York Yankees.

=== Montebello ===
On the north side of 33rd Street, near the intersection of 33rd and The Alameda, was the Federal-styled mansion and estate of Montebello, named after the European battle. Built in 1799, it originally belonged to Samuel Smith, a famous city merchant/financier, U.S. Representative, U.S. Senator, Mayor and commanding Major General of Maryland State Militia during the War of 1812 and the Battle of Baltimore. It was razed circa 1907.
