= History of the Irish in Baltimore =

The history of the Irish in Baltimore dates back to the early and mid-19th century. The city's Irish-American community is centered in the neighborhoods of Hampden, Canton, Highlandtown, Fell's Point and Locust Point.

== Demographics ==
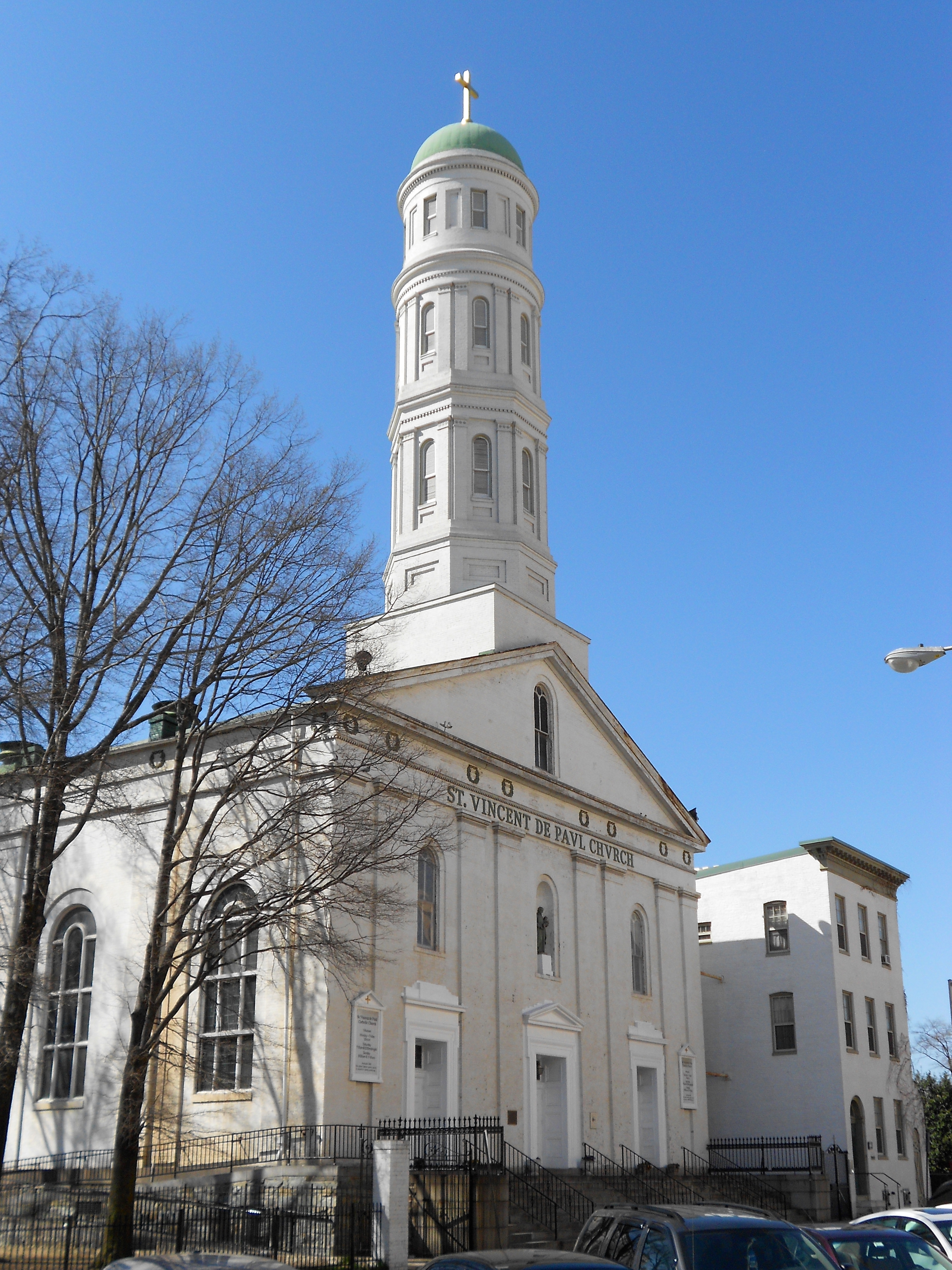
St. Vincent de Paul Church in Jonestown, September 2014.

Work advertisement in the Baltimore Sun, April 21, 1857: "No Irish need apply."

In 1880, the Irish made up a large portion of the foreign-born population of Baltimore at 24.6% of all foreign born residents. 16.9% (56,354) of Baltimore was foreign born, 13,863 of them Irish.

In 1920, 10,240 foreign-born White people in Baltimore spoke an English or Celtic language. At that time 6% of the foreign-born white population was from Ireland, most of any Northwestern European country.

In 1940, 2,159 immigrants from Ireland lived in Baltimore. These immigrants comprised 3.5% of the city's foreign-born white population. In total, 4,077 people of Irish birth or descent lived in the city, comprising 4.6% of the foreign-stock white population.

In the 1940 United States census, Irish-Americans comprised 22% of the foreign-born population in Highlandtown. In Hamden, Baltimore's tract 13–5, 7% of foreign-born residents were Irish-American.

The Irish-American community in the Baltimore metropolitan area numbered 341,683 as of 2000, making up 13.4% of the area's population. This made them the second largest European ethnic group in the Baltimore area after the Germans. In the same year, 32,755 people in the Baltimore metropolitan area were of Scottish-Irish descent, comprising 1.3% of the metropolitan area's population. In the same year Baltimore city's Irish-American population was 39,045, 6% of the city's population. In the same year, 3,274 people in Baltimore were of Scottish-Irish descent, comprising 0.5% of the city's population.

In 2011, immigrants from Ireland were the sixty-sixth largest foreign-born population in Baltimore.

In 2013, an estimated 37,359 Irish-Americans resided in Baltimore city, 6% of the population.

== History ==
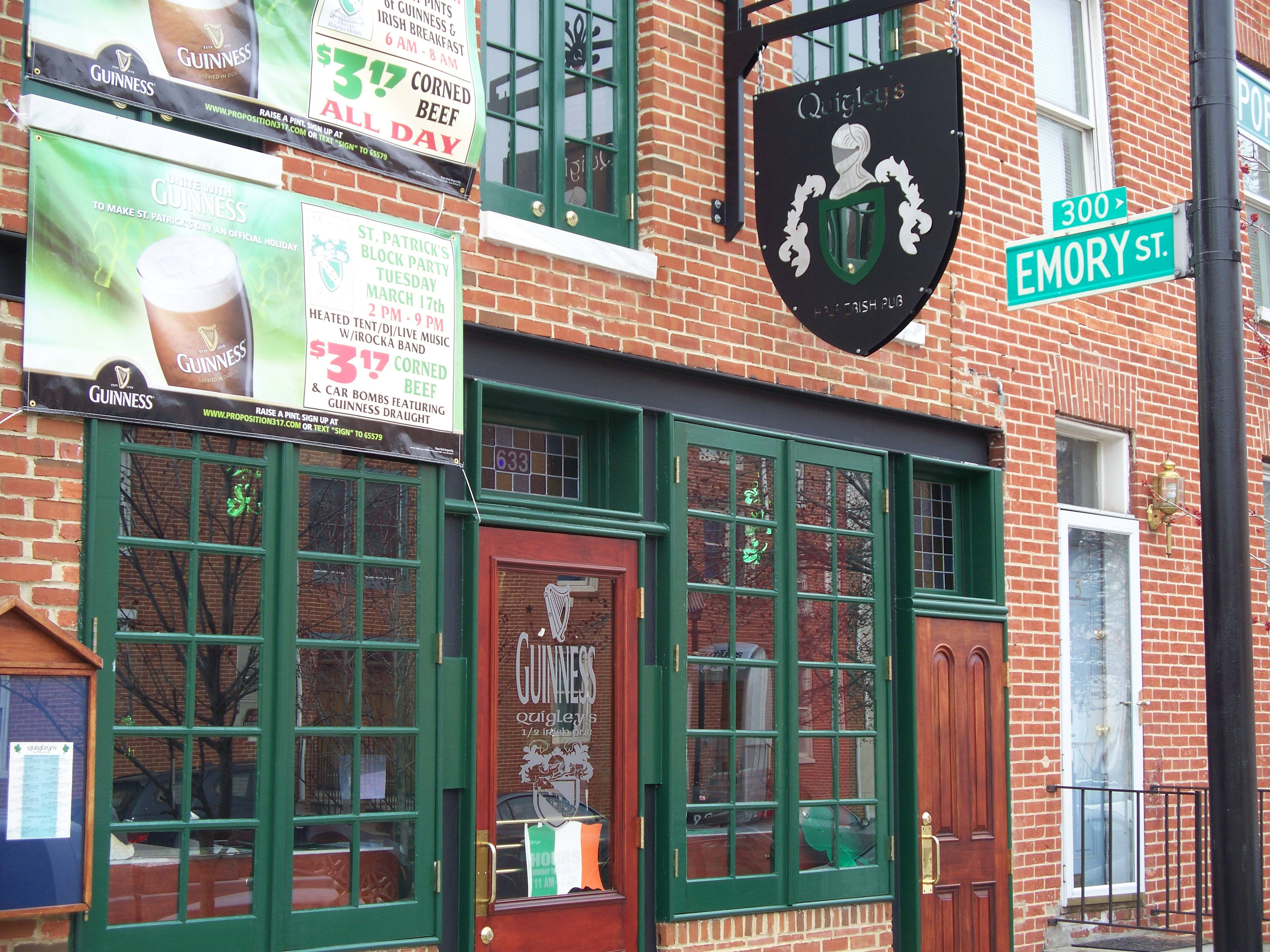
Quigley's Half-Irish Pub located in Ridgely's Delight, March 2009.

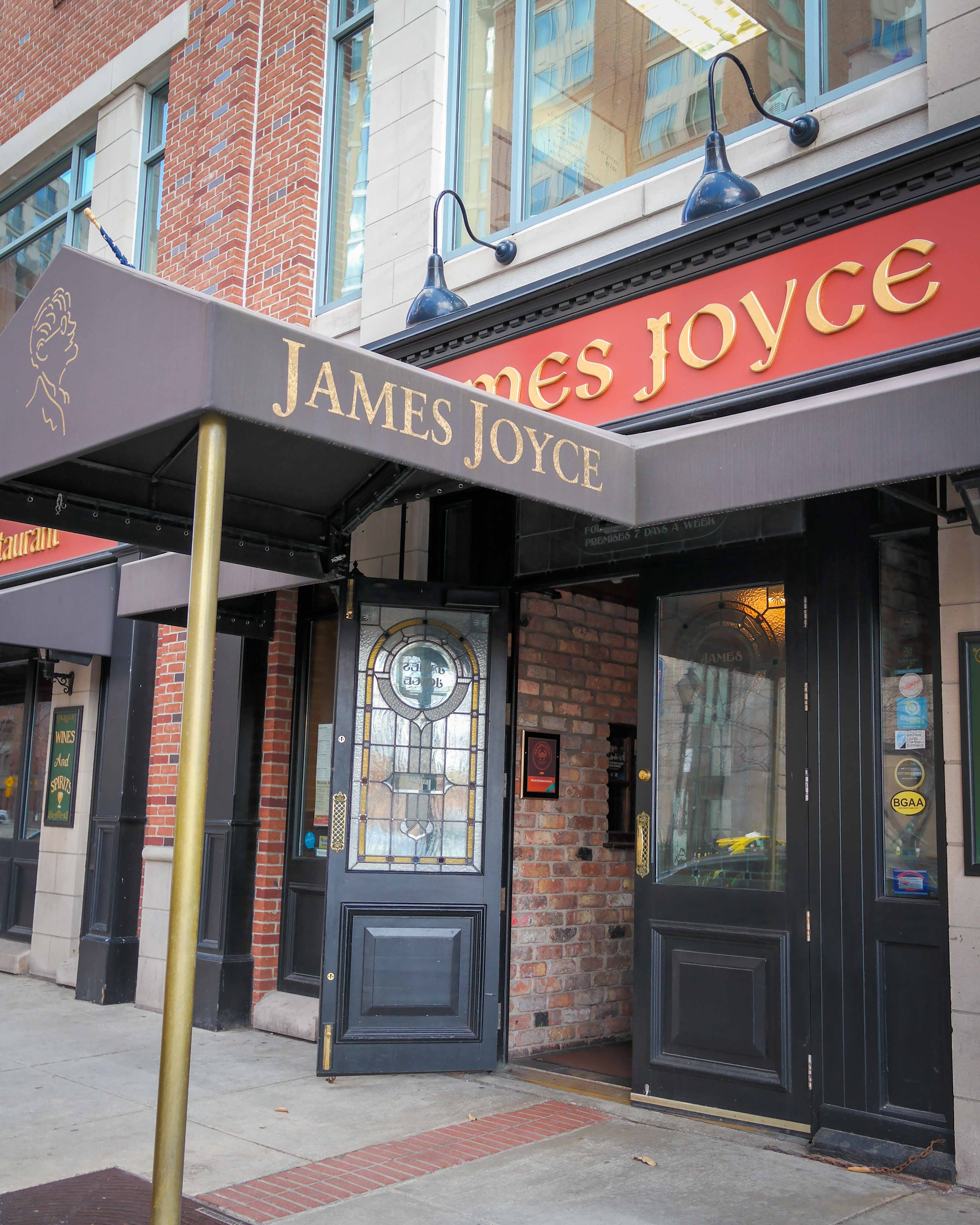
The James Joyce Pub in Harbor East, April 2015.

During the 1700s and 1800s, many states in the United States allowed male non-citizens to vote. Anti-German Catholic and anti-Irish Catholic sentiment following the War of 1812 and intensifying again in the 1840s lead many states, particularly in the Northeast, to amend their constitutions to prohibit non-citizens from voting. Non-citizen voting was banned by the Maryland Constitution of 1851.

Baltimore became a leading destination for Irish immigrants to the United States in the mid-1800s during the Great Famine, with around 70,000 Irish people settling in the city during the 1850s and 1860s.

Prior to the passage of the Fair Housing Act of 1968, racially restrictive covenants were used in Baltimore to exclude African-Americans and other minority groups. Some Irish-American real estate developers, such as Edward J. Gallagher, developed segregated housing. Advertisements in the Baltimore Sun describe Gallagher's Ednor Gardens, named after his sons Edward and Norman, as racially "restricted".

== Notable Irish-Americans from Baltimore ==
- J. G. Bannon, a college football coach who served as the head coach at the Maryland Agricultural College in 1894.
- Philip Berrigan, a peace activist and former Roman Catholic priest.
- James Carroll, a railroad executive, judge, and politician.
- John Carroll, a prelate of the Roman Catholic Church who served as the ordinary of the Archdiocese of Baltimore.
- John Lee Carroll, a member of the United States Democratic Party who was the 37th Governor of Maryland from 1876 to 1880.
- Elizabeth Patterson Bonaparte (Scotch-Irish), a socialite who was the daughter of Baltimore merchant William Patterson and the first wife of Napoleon's youngest brother Jérôme Bonaparte.
- Michael Joseph Curley, an Irish-born clergyman of the Roman Catholic Church who served as the tenth Archbishop of Baltimore (1921–1947).
- John Samuel Foley, a prelate of the Roman Catholic Church.
- Edward J. Gallagher, a prolific real estate builder who constructed many of Baltimore's row houses.
- James Gibbons, a Cardinal of the Roman Catholic Church who served as the ninth Archbishop of Baltimore from 1877 until his death in 1921.
- J. Harold Grady, a judge and the mayor of Baltimore, Maryland from 1959 to 1962.
- David Hasselhoff, an actor, singer, producer, and businessman.
- Pat Healey, a soccer player who plays for Baltimore Blast.
- Billie Holiday, a jazz musician and singer-songwriter with a career spanning nearly thirty years.
- George Proctor Kane, a politician and policeman best known for his role as Marshal of Police during the Baltimore riot of 1861.
- William H. Keeler, a Cardinal of the Roman Catholic Church who served as Archbishop of Baltimore from 1989 to 2007.
- Thomas Kelso, an Irish-born philanthropist and businessman.
- Ambrose Jerome Kennedy, a U.S. Representative from Maryland.
- John Alexander Kennedy, the superintendent of police for New York City.
- John P. Kennedy, a novelist and Whig politician who served as United States Secretary of the Navy and as a U.S. Representative from Maryland's 4th congressional district.
- Francis Patrick Keough, a clergyman of the Roman Catholic Church who served as Archbishop of Baltimore (1947–1961).
- Francis Kenrick, an Irish-born prelate of the Roman Catholic Church who served as the sixth Archbishop of the Archdiocese of Baltimore (1851–1863).
- Laura Lippman (Scotch-Irish), an author of detective fiction.
- Patrick Mullen, member of the United States Navy and one of only 19 servicemen to twice receive the Medal of Honor.
- Edwin Frederick O'Brien, Cardinal prelate of the Roman Catholic Church who served as 15th Archbishop of Baltimore from 2007 to 2011.
- Peter Maher, an Irish-born boxer known for his powerful punch.
- Jim McKay, a television sports journalist.
- Bryan Mullanphy, the tenth Mayor of St. Louis, serving from 1847 to 1848.
- John Mullanphy, an Irish immigrant who became a wealthy merchant in St. Louis and in Baltimore.
- Herbert O'Conor, the 51st Governor of Maryland, serving from 1939 to 1947.
- Frank O'Hara, a writer, poet and art critic.
- Martin O'Malley, a politician who served as Baltimore City Councilor from 1991 to 1999, Mayor of Baltimore from 1999 to 2007, and 61st Governor of Maryland from 2007 to 2015.
- Michael Phelps, a former competitive swimmer and the most decorated Olympian of all time, with a total of 28 medals.
- Edgar Allan Poe (Scotch-Irish). Poe was born in Boston, but was descended from a prominent Baltimore family and launched his literary career while living in Baltimore in the early 1830s. He was a writer, editor, and literary critic best known for his tales of mystery and the macabre.
- William Patterson (Scotch-Irish), a businessman, a gun-runner during the American Revolution, and a founder of the Baltimore and Ohio Railroad.
- Thomas Ruckle, a house painter and sign painter in early nineteenth century Baltimore and an amateur painter.
- Martin John Spalding, a clergyman of the Roman Catholic Church who served as Archbishop of Baltimore (1864–1872).
- James Stafford, a cardinal of the Roman Catholic Church who served as Auxiliary Bishop of Baltimore (1976–1982).
- Robert Strawbridge, a Methodist preacher born in Drumsna, County Leitrim, Ireland.
- Joseph Stewart, a Union Army soldier in the American Civil War who received the U.S. military's highest decoration, the Medal of Honor, for his actions at the Battle of Five Forks.
- May Wilson, an artist and figure in the 1960s to 1970s New York City avant-garde art world and pioneer of the feminist and mail art movements.

=== Fictional Irish-Americans from Baltimore ===
- Roger Gaffney, a fictional police officer of the Baltimore Police Department on Homicide: Life on the Street played by Walt MacPherson.
- Colm Gallagher, a fictional schoolmaster of the Oliver Hibernian Free School in Weaving Roots by Heather Wood.
- Stuart Gharty, a fictional character played by Peter Gerety in the television series Homicide: Life on the Street.
- Mike Kellerman, a fictional character on the television drama series Homicide: Life on the Street portrayed by Reed Diamond.
- Jimmy McNulty, a fictional detective in the Baltimore Police Department on the HBO drama The Wire, played by Dominic West.
- Megan Russert, a fictional character on Homicide: Life on the Street played by Isabella Hofmann.
- Jack Ryan, a fictional character created by Tom Clancy who appears in many of his novels and their respective film adaptations.

=== Fictional Irish-Americans from Baltimore ===
- Roger Gaffney, a fictional police officer of the Baltimore Police Department on Homicide: Life on the Street played by Walt MacPherson.
- Colm Gallagher, a fictional schoolmaster of the Oliver Hibernian Free School in Weaving Roots by Heather Wood.
- Stuart Gharty, a fictional character played by Peter Gerety in the television series Homicide: Life on the Street.
- Mike Kellerman, a fictional character on the television drama series Homicide: Life on the Street portrayed by Reed Diamond.
- Jimmy McNulty, a fictional detective in the Baltimore Police Department on the HBO drama The Wire, played by Dominic West.
- Megan Russert, a fictional character on Homicide: Life on the Street played by Isabella Hofmann.
- Jack Ryan (character), a fictional character created by Tom Clancy who appears in many of his novels and their respective film adaptations.

== See also ==
- Ethnic groups in Baltimore
- History of Baltimore
- History of the Irish in Boston
- History of the Irish in Indianapolis
- History of the Irish in Louisville
- History of the Irish in Saint Paul
- History of the Irish in New York City
