= Patrick Mullen =

Patrick Mullen is the name of:

- Patrick Mullen (ice hockey) (born 1986), American ice hockey player
- Patrick Mullen (Medal of Honor) (1844–1897), member of the United States Navy

== See also ==
- Pat Mullin (1917–1999), baseball player
- Patrick Mullins (born 1992), soccer player
- Patrick Mullins (jockey) (born 1989), amateur jockey
