= Better Waverly, Baltimore =

Better Waverly
- neighborhood statistical area
- Location within Baltimore
- Coordinates: 39.3284955°N 76.602951°W
- Country: United States
- State: Maryland
- City: Baltimore

Area
  - Total: 0.207 sq mi (0.54 km^{2})
  - Land: 0.207 sq mi (0.54 km^{2})

Population (2015)
  - Total: 2,301
  - Density: 11,100/sq mi (4,290/km^{2})
- Time zone: UTC-5 (Eastern)
  - Summer (DST): UTC-4 (EDT)
- ZIP code: 21218
- Area code: 410, 443, and 667

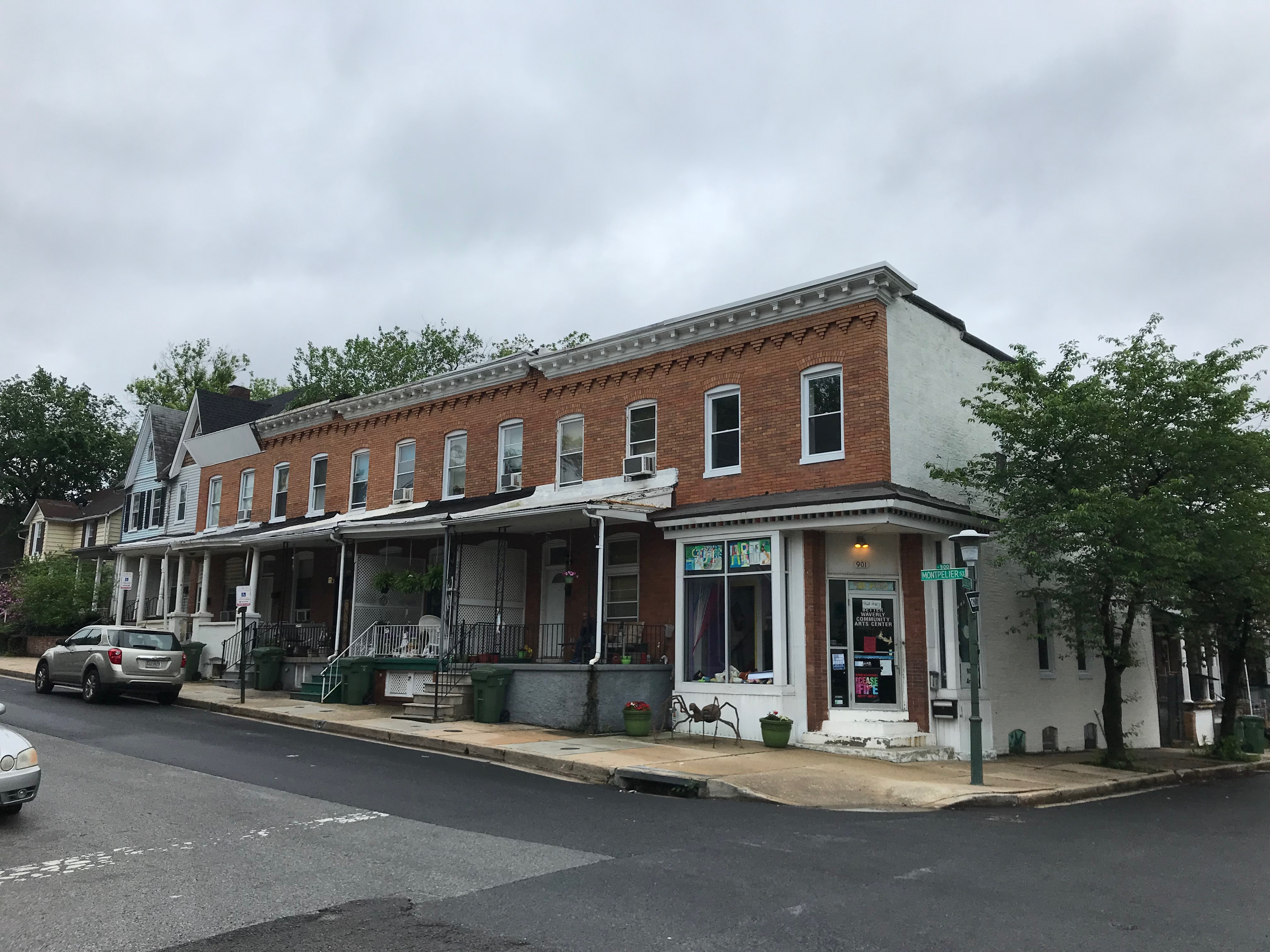

Better Waverly is a neighborhood in the North District of Baltimore, located between the neighborhoods of Charles Village (west) and Coldstream-Homestead-Montebello (east). Its boundaries are marked by East 33rd Street (north), Exeter Hall Avenue (south), Greenmount Avenue (west) and Loch Raven Road (east).

The neighborhoods of Better Waverly (south of 33rd Street) and Waverly (north of 33rd Street, also known as Waverly-north) take their names from the Sir Walter Scott's first novel, Waverly. The Better was added in the 1970s as community members asked "how to make Waverly better".

Baltimore's former Memorial Stadium was originally located on the opposite side of East 33rd Street from Better Waverly, until the structure was demolished on February 15, 2002. At Mile 22, also known as the "Eddie Murray Mile", the Baltimore Marathon passes through Better Waverly.

== Demographics ==
As of 2015, there were 2,301 people and 924 households, and 3,873 families residing in the neighborhood. There were 863 housing units, with approximately 40% owner-occupied and 60% renter-occupied. The racial makeup of the neighborhood was 75% Black or African American, 20% White, 2% Asian, 1% Native American, and 2% from two or more races.

The median income for a household north of Montpelier Street was $40,250 and $30,855 south of Montpelier Street. Approximately 10% of residents have a bachelor's degree or higher. 25 percent of residents reported receiving public assistance income in the last 12 months.

== Victorian village ==
In the mid-19th century, wealthy merchants built a Victorian village along Old York Road in the area that became Better Waverly. The village had its own town hall at 3100 Greenmount Avenue. This area is listed in the National Register of Historic Places as the Waverly Main Street Historic District. Located in Better Waverly between Greenmount Avenue (west) and Ellerslie Avenue (east), it extends north to include all of the neighborhood of Waverly (also known as North Waverly). Many wood-frame houses remain in the neighborhood from the Victorian period. The neighborhood was later infilled with brick rowhouses characteristic of Baltimore.

== Public transportation ==
Quickbus Route 48 (MTA Maryland) stops at East 33rd Street along Greenmount Avenue while traveling between Towson Town Center and the University of Maryland.

CityLink Red (BaltimoreLink) and LocalLink 52 (BaltimoreLink) have stops along Greenmount Avenue.

CityLink Green (BaltimoreLink) provides service along Loch Raven Road, traveling between Sheppard Pratt Hospital and the Inner Harbor.

== See also ==
- List of Baltimore neighborhoods
