= Rachel Cliff =

Rachel Cliff may refer to:

- Rachel Cliff (athlete) (born 1988), Canadian long-distance runner
- Rachel Cliff (politician) (1806–1885), American janitor and politician
