= Edward J. Gallagher =

American real estate developer

Edward Joseph Gallagher
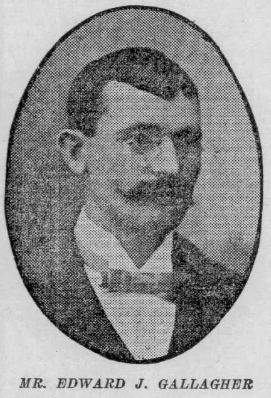
- Born: Baltimore, Maryland
- Occupation: Real estate developer
- Relatives: Edward J. Gallagher, Jr.

Edward Joseph Gallagher, also known as E. J. Gallagher, was a prolific real estate developer in Baltimore during the late 1800s and early 1900s. Gallagher built many of Baltimore's now iconic row houses. His best known development was the neighborhood of Ednor Gardens-Lakeside.

== Early life ==
Gallagher was born in Baltimore, the son of Irish immigrants.

== Career ==
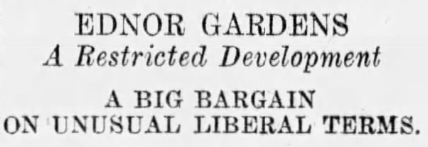
An advertisement in the Baltimore Sun for racially restrictive housing in Ednor Gardens, March 11, 1928.

As a youth, Gallagher apprenticed as a carpenter. He was also an amateur painter and earned a law degree from the Baltimore College Law School in the 1890s. In July, 1888, he built his first house on his own in Canton. Gallagher was building row houses at a time when large numbers of immigrants were moving to Baltimore. Several real estate developers, including Galagher, were the leaders in the real estate market this population boom created. In 1895 to 1896, he partnered with Francis Yewell to build houses for Baltimore's elite on Eutaw Street. By 1909, Gallagher had incorporated a real estate business as the E.J. Gallagher Realty Company. In the 1920s, he developed Saint Clair, a working-class rowhouse community. Gallagher's best known development, Ednor Gardens, was named after his son Edward and his son Albert Norman. By the 1930s, Edward and Norman were managing the company. His sons also helped manage the Eastern Supply Company, a building materials and coal company he had acquired.

Prior to the passage of the Fair Housing Act of 1968, racially restrictive covenants were used in Baltimore to exclude African-Americans and other minority groups. Advertisements in the Baltimore Sun described Gallagher's Ednor Gardens as "restricted".

== Death and legacy ==
Gallagher died in 1933. His sons Edward and Norman inherited the family businesses. Gallagher's Acreage Land Company had been dissolved in 1938 and his Montebello Land Company and Eastern Supply Company were both dissolved in 1952. Following this, Norman Gallagher's sons created their own Gallagher Construction Company. Because Gallagher was a painter and a supporter of the arts, Edward Jr. established the Edward Joseph Gallagher III Memorial Collection in his honor at the University of Arizona. Gallagher's house, Villa Madrid, has been placed on the registry of Historical Buildings. The Ednor Gardens Historic District is listed on the National Register of Historic Places.

== See also ==
- Frank Novak (architect)
- History of the Irish in Baltimore
