= Waverly, Baltimore =

Waverly
- neighborhood statistical area
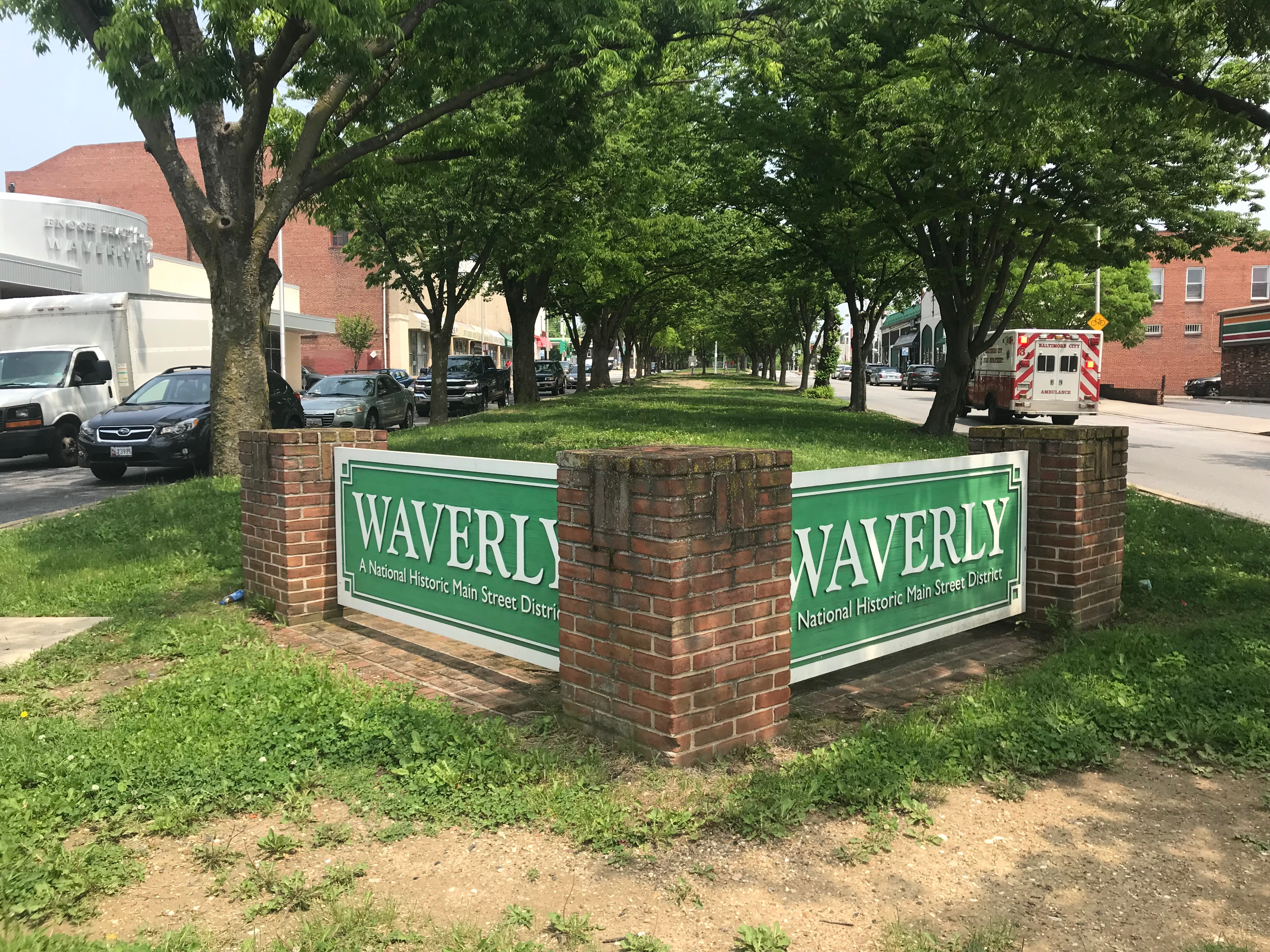
- Waverly median sign, E. 33rd Street and Barclay Street

- Location within Baltimore
- Coordinates: 39°19′56″N 76°36′24″W
- Country: United States
- State: Maryland
- City: Baltimore

Area
  - Total: 0.149 sq mi (0.39 km^{2})
  - Land: 0.149 sq mi (0.39 km^{2})

Population (2010)
  - Total: 3,551
  - Density: 23,800/sq mi (9,200/km^{2})
- Time zone: UTC-5 (Eastern)
  - Summer (DST): UTC-4 (EDT)
- ZIP code: 21218
- Area code: 410, 443, and 667

Waverly is a neighborhood in the north central area of Baltimore, Maryland, located to the north of the adjacent same neighborhood called Better Waverly and west of Ednor Gardens-Lakeside, north and east of Charles Village (formerly named Peabody Heights when laid out in the 1870s) west of the area of Coldstream-Homestead-Montebello neighborhoods, along with the campus of the former red brick H-shaped building for Eastern High School (1938–1984), facing north towards 33rd Street, now renovated since the 1990s into offices for The Johns Hopkins University, a mile to the west. Adjacent to the east of the Eastern High/Johns Hopkins campus is the landmark tree-shaded campus of The Baltimore City College (high school), at 33rd Street and The Alameda. The College is a massive stone structure with a 150-foot bell tower visible for miles, nicknamed "The Castle on the Hill", constructed 1926–1928 of Collegiate Gothic architecture on one of the highest hills in the city, "Collegian Hill", with the downtown skyline visible to the south. City College (also known as "City") is the third oldest public high school in America, founded 1839 in downtown has been through eight different sites in its 179 years of history and five major buildings, each were architectural landmarks in their times. From its beginnings, until 1979, it was a single sex secondary school for boys in the Baltimore City Public Schools, when it co-educated admitting young women. These three major institutions and their sports events dominated the east side of Waverly/Better Waverly for nine decades.

Waverly's boundaries are drawn by Greenmount Avenue/York Road (Maryland Route 45) on the west, To the east is Ellerslie Avenue (and former site of old Municipal Stadium [football only bowl] (1922–1950) / Memorial Stadium (1950–2002), now occupied by a YMCA housing community with the space for the original historic diamond baseball field remaining in the center of the complex. On the east, East 39th Street to the north bordering the tomey mansions of the Guilford community and East 33rd Street (boulevard) to the south. Originally known as the village of Huntingdon in the mid 1800s, just beyond Boundary Avenue (now North Avenue) at the northern edge of the city's limits of 1818, when the three matching old fieldstone structures for the Episcopal Church of St. John's of Huntingdon were constructed with the first in 1847 on Old York Road, the little lane once running north all the way to York, Pennsylvania in the 19th century, now parallel to the east of modern Greenmount Avenue are remnants of that earlier identity, when 25th Street to the south was once known as Huntingdon Avenue.

The Waverly community takes its later current name from the Scottish author Walter Scott's debut novel Waverly.

Waverly Main Street Historic District, an area listed in the National Register of Historic Places, includes all of the Waverly neighborhood, and the portion of the additional Better Waverly neighborhood located to the east between Greenmount Avenue and Ellerslie Avenue by the former old stadiums site. The Waverly neighborhood is also referred to by residents as "Waverly-north" to distinguish it from the area of the historic district overlapping Better Waverly to the south.

Baltimore's former Memorial Stadium for baseball and football professional/collegiate sports was originally located on the opposite side of Ellerslie Avenue from Waverly (and previously a huge football-only bowl named Municipal Stadium (or sometimes called Baltimore Stadium or Venable Park Stadium) seating 100,000 located there 1922–1949, for college/university and high school games until the structure was demolished on February 15, 2002. . For three seasons in 1947–1949, the first professional football team franchise in a new competing league of the All-America Football Conference began play with that first Baltimore Colts team of the AAFC.

When work started in 1949, demolishing the old Municipal Stadium bowl for the replacement multi-sports facility with an upper deck, later renamed Memorial Stadium and opened for professional football with the Baltimore Colts of the AAFC along with three other teams now merging with the National Football League (NFL) for what turned out to be only one season of 1950, before failing in a financial collapse. But then civic efforts were made with new financial backing and three seasons later a second NFL franchise team came to town in the Fall of 1953 which remained here for three decades to 1984.

The Baltimore Orioles in the minor level International League were at the football field since 1944 when a tragic fire burned down their Oriole Park wooden stadium on the northwest corner of Greenmount Avenue and 29th Street and so the minor league "Triple AAA" level Birds relocated to the 33rd Street 1922 football bowl for the rest of the 1944 season and starting in 1945 for temporarily the next decade until razing began in 1949. Then the reconstructed stadium project was put on a crash completion schedule in 1952–1953, when the city also almost simultaneously acquired a Major League Baseball level team in November 1953 for the first time in a half-century, buying out the previous owner when the St. Louis Browns relocated east to Maryland and were renamed the new Baltimore Orioles in the American League and opened their first season here in April 1954, just as the newly rebuilt Memorial Stadium was nearly completed and ready, soon making the Waverly and Greenmount Avenue communities busy and crowded even more than in previous decades on game days.

== History ==
The area currently known as Waverly was previously a tiny village along York Road known as Huntingdon. As wealthy residents began building summer cottages there in the late 19th century, a firehouse, town hall and post office were added to the community. To avoid confusion with other places using the Huntingdon name, this postal village was named for Sir Walter Scott's novel, Waverly.

Baltimore schoolteacher and poet Lizette Woodworth Reese's Waverly, A Victorian Village (1929) uses poetry and anecdotal prose to depict the neighborhood around the start of the 20th century. The frontispiece from this volume, a woodcut of a fruit tree, could be seen at the entrance to the Waverly branch of the Enoch Pratt Free Library until its renovation in 2015.

The Waverly library, the fifth most popular branch of Baltimore's public library system, underwent a US$6 million renovation project begun in August 2013 and completed in August 2015, nearly a year behind schedule. Founded in 1971 and first renovated in 1986, the 2015 project added 3,000 square feet, 35 additional public computers, and an enlarged community meeting room to the branch.

Rapper and actor Tupac Shakur resided at 3955 Greenmount Avenue in the mid to late 1980s with his family.

Another notable Waverly resident was Major Richard M. Venable, a lawyer who wrote a standard legal textbook and dedicated much of his personal time to improving Baltimore's public parks. Venable Street is named after him (Baltimore Sun), along with his name being originally affixed to the park which would eventually become the site of Memorial Stadium.

Architecture is primarily row houses and wood Victorian single-family homes. Some of the latter are in a historic district designated by the city's Center for Historic and Architectural Preservation.

== See also ==
- List of Baltimore neighborhoods E Greenmount av 22nd st to 28th st
