= St. Vincent de Paul Church (Baltimore) =

Historic church in Maryland, United States

- St. Vincent De Paul Roman Catholic Church
- U.S. National Register of Historic Places
- Baltimore City Landmark
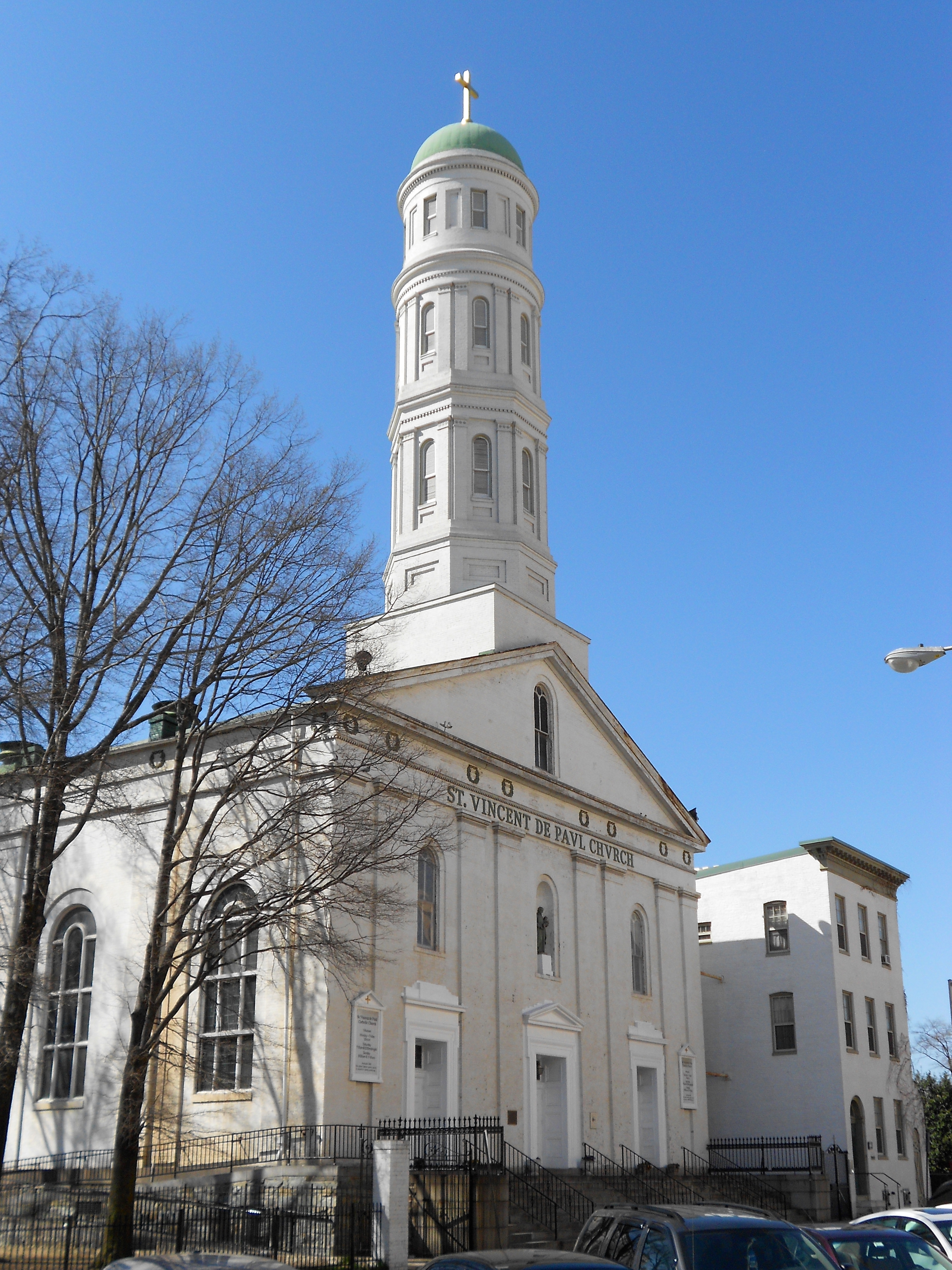
- Interactive map of St. Vincent De Paul Roman Catholic Church
- Location: 120 N. Front St., Baltimore, Maryland
- Coordinates: 39°17′28.9″N 76°36′22.5″W
- Area: less than one acre
- Built: 1840
- Architects: Gildea, Father John Baptist
- Architectural style: Georgian
- NRHP reference No.: 74002215

Significant dates
- Added to NRHP: February 12, 1974
- Designated BCL: 1975

St. Vincent de Paul Church is a historic Roman Catholic church located within the Archdiocese of Baltimore at 120 N. Front Street, Baltimore, Maryland, United States.

== History ==
The church was dedicated in 1841 and is "the oldest Catholic parish church in continuous use in Baltimore."

The history of St. Vincent is entwined with the history of Baltimore itself. It was founded in 1840 by Irish workers who were building the Baltimore and Ohio Railroad and the Chesapeake and Ohio Canal. Fr. John Baptist Gildea was the first pastor when the building was opened in 1841 to parishioners. The Irish immigrants working on these landmarks were a large part of the Catholic community, though membership included those from all social ranks, even slaves. It was the fifth Roman Catholic church constructed in Baltimore, and was built to serve the ever-increasing, wealthy, English-speaking Catholics in the Gay and Pratt Street area.

By 1865, weekly attendance was approximately 2,000 people. Unique among churches during this time period, St. Vincent's welcomed free people of color and slaves. Depressions in the floor in the rear of the church still show where the slave gallery was located after it was removed during a 1890s restoration.

In 1875, the church was consecrated by Archbishop James Gibbons, one of four churches so recognized in America, which placed it under the direct protection of the Holy See. The parish's most famous son was James Cardinal Gibbons (1834-1921). By the 1880s, St. Vincent's was the largest parish in the Archdiocese with over 7000 parishioners. In the 1890s, the demographics of the neighborhood shifted with new Italian immigrants, reflected by renovations to the church at the time.

Due to declining membership in the 1920s, St. Vincent's began to offer mass late Saturday night/early Sunday morning for the pressmen who printed the Sunday papers of the Baltimore Sun and the Baltimore News, each located nearby. Soon there were four such "Printers' Masses" each weekend which became very popular, attended by about 1,400. Printers were joined, and typically far out-numbered, by late-night revelers who took advantage of the unique mass time.

In the 1960s the church was actively involved in movements against the Vietnam War and social changes which helped to attract young activists to the parish and its causes. The church and its members are very proud of the wide variety of backgrounds and cultures that have accumulated over their long and diverse history. St. Vincent is still an active and engaged parish in 2019. The current pastor is Father Evan Ponton.

== Structure ==
The church building itself is neoclassical style with brick walls painted white to give it the appearance of wood. Inside there are cast iron columns for support. While the interior has been remodeled several times, the exterior of the church has never been altered.

Over its 178-year life, those responsible for St Vincent’s have invested in maintaining the original structure. A comprehensive interior renovation was completed in 1991, in time to celebrate the 150th anniversary of construction.

The church features a slender Georgian-style brick tower, painted white, which rises to a height of 150 feet above the narthex and contrasts sharply with its surroundings. The tower rests on an octagonal base and supports three successive indented tiers (one octagonal and two cylindrical), capped by a copper-sheathed dome and twelve-foot gold-leafed cross. Visually paired with the nearby red brick historic Phoenix Shot Tower, St. Vincent's white bell tower still serves as an iconic image for the historic Jonestown neighborhood of Baltimore. The church building features pediments and lintels quarried from Jones Falls stone.

St. Vincent De Paul Roman Catholic Church was listed on the National Register of Historic Places in 1974. From the Commission for Historical and Architectural Preservation letter filed with the National Register: From November 7, 1841, until the present, St Vincent de Paul Church has been a major visual landmark in Baltimore. Its white tower loomed prominently in the 19th century skyline of that part of the city east of the Jones Falls known as “Old Town,” and as such was easily visible from the harbor by all the ships in that busy era. It was the sole survivor of the razing by the Urban Renewal Programs in the late 1950s, making it at the time even more visible in the middle of cleared land…[it] is one of the few surviving early Catholic parish churches remaining in this city.

== Location ==
When the church was completed, the rear of the building faced the Jones Falls, then an open river. The Jones Falls was constant source of concern to the church due to it frequent and unpredictable floods. The Jones Falls was covered over and paved in 1911 to form the Jones Falls Expressway, which now terminates in front of the church.

== Community services ==
The parish is active in both worship and service (opening every day year-round for Mass) with a variety of social outreach ministries in service to the local community, especially to poor and homeless people. The parish supports a monthly men's clothes closet and weekly food pantry, and a Resource Exchange (which provides household set-ups for newly-housed individuals). It also hosts (in partnership with Our Lady of the Fields Catholic Church) a Friday Dinner each week in which volunteers serve hot dinners to local homeless persons. The parish owns a small park, in which all are welcome. The park is the Archdiocese of Baltimore's resting-place for the Homeless Jesus statue. This bronze sculpture is seen in many places around the world as a reminder of the Gospel call to care for "the least of these."

The church also offers a variety of religious education opportunities for children, teenagers, and adults including classes, retreats, camps, workshops, and discussion groups. St Vincent is also involved in local housing needs including replacing public housing projects with row homes for families. The most recent project is located on Pratt Street. St. Vincent was an active participant in developing the Heritage Walk, a Baltimore project, and is one of the stops on the tour. Besides being involved in local communities of Baltimore, St. Vincent also has two sisters parishes that they work to help. One is located in Nicaragua and the other in Lithuania.
