= Horace Abbott =

American iron manufacturer (1806-1887)

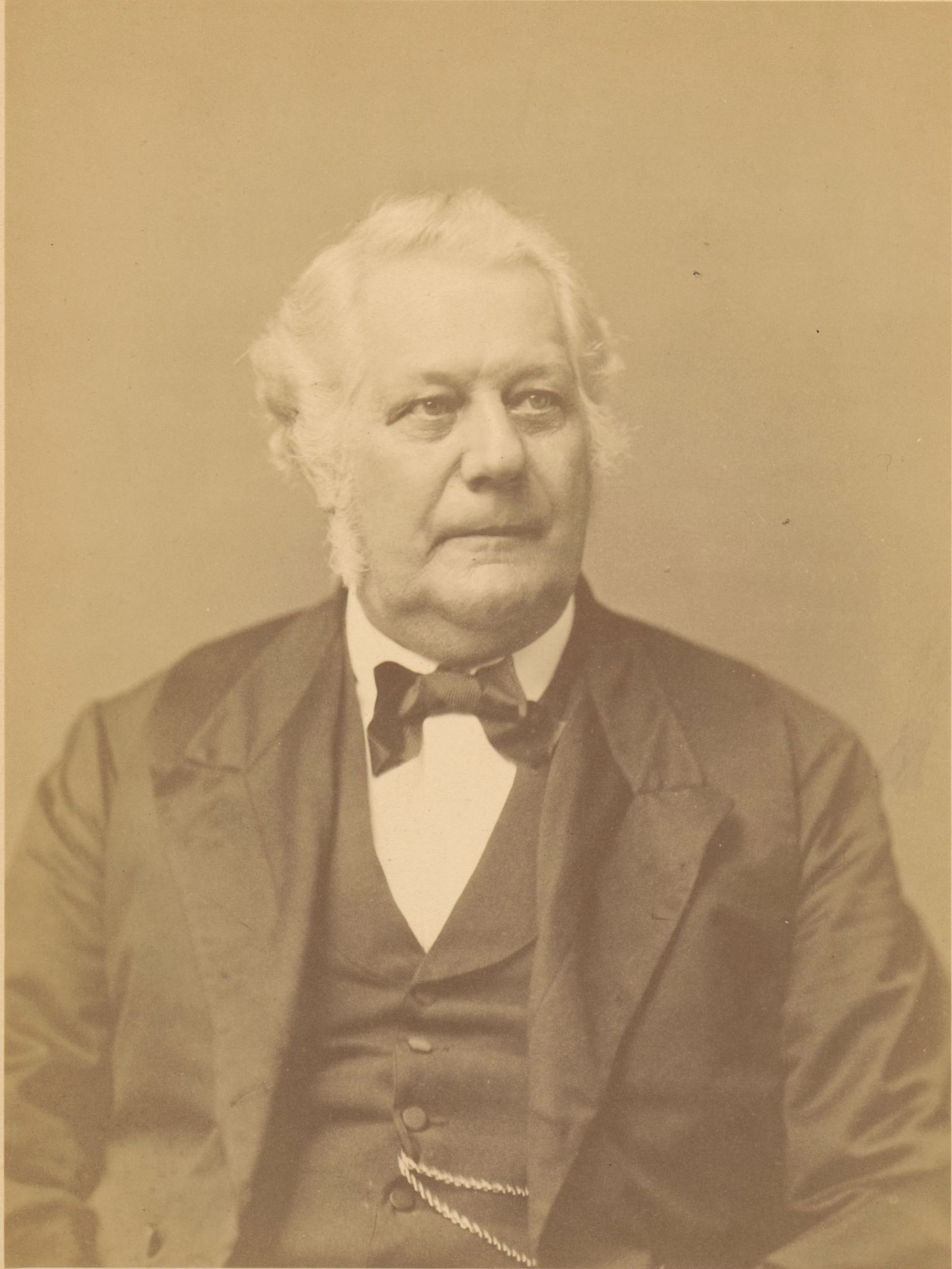
- Abbott, c. 1866-71
- Born: July 29, 1806; Sudbury, Massachusetts, U.S.
- Died: August 8, 1887 (aged 81); Baltimore, Maryland, U.S.
- Occupations: Iron manufacturer, banker

Horace Abbott (July 29, 1806 – August 8, 1887) was an American iron manufacturer and banker. His work included the armor plating for the USS Monitor, USS Agamenticus, USS Roanoke, and USS Monadnock.

He was born in Sudbury, Massachusetts, to Alpheus Abbott and Lydia Fay, who were both farmers. After his father's death and subsequent blacksmithing apprenticeship, Abbott moved to Baltimore, Maryland, in 1836 and purchased the Canton Iron Works in Canton, which specialized in the production of steamboat and railroad components. It was renamed the Abbott Iron Company. The company's 1850 mill was the largest iron mill in the United States at that time. It was said that iron plates were rolled here for shipment to New York City for John Ericsson's revolutionary new ship, the ironclad USS Monitor which fought in the 1862 Battle of Hampton Roads during the Civil War.

He was also the founder of Baltimore's First National Bank and a director of the Second National Bank of Baltimore and the Union Railroad of Baltimore, acquired by the Northern Central Railway in 1882 and eventually becoming part of the Pennsylvania Railroad. He lived at his country estate, "Abbotston", in northeast Baltimore, near the present location of 33rd Street and The Alameda, on one of the highest hills in the city, near the village of Huntingdon (now Waverly) to the west and the Coldstream-Homestead-Montebello community off Harford Road to the east. A Victorian mansion was constructed in the 1870s near the earlier Federal-era estate of "Montebello" of Samuel Smith (1752–1839), U.S. Senator, Baltimore mayor, and commanding general of the Maryland militia during the War of 1812 during the British attack against Baltimore, and a later Victorian mansion of the same name belonging to John Work Garrett, Civil War-era president of the Baltimore and Ohio Railroad.He also endowed the Abbott Memorial Presbyterian Church on Bank Street in the Highlandtown neighborhood of southeast Baltimore.

Abbott died in Baltimore in 1887.
