= Colored National Convention of 1855 =

- Part of Colored Conventions Movement
- Date: October 16–18, 1855
- Venue: Franklin Hall
- Location: Philadelphia, Pennsylvania, United States
- Also known as: 1855 National Colored Convention

The Colored National Convention of 1855 was a colored convention event held on October 16, 17, and 18 at Franklin Hall in Philadelphia, Pennsylvania. It consisted of delegates from Massachusetts, Rhode Island, Connecticut, New York, Pennsylvania, New Jersey, and Canada.

== History ==
The Colored National Convention of 1855 delegates ranged from famous African Americans like Frederick Douglass, and Mary Ann Shadd, to unknowns like Rachel Cliff. Other notable delegates at this event included Nathaniel W. Depee, Samuel Green, Catherine "Kitty" Green, Robert Purvis, George T. Downing, Stephen Myers, Charles Lenox Remond, and John S. Rock. It is thought that Harriet Tubman may have attended. There were a handful of female delegates in attendance, although their numbers were incomparable to the number of males. Nonetheless, their presence was striking in an age when women’s rights had barely begun to be realized. In addition, the female delegates’ husbands were not invited to the convention; such independence makes the women’s presence still more remarkable.

The main theme of the convention was economic and social liberty for free African Americans. The delegates recognized that while the abolition of slavery was an important issue, it would be useless if the racial prejudice that had grown up in the North was allowed to persist. The convention strongly condemned the Fugitive Slave Act of 1850. Therefore, they discussed ways to help African Americans become economically independent, in order to gain the respect of whites. First, they brought up the creation of an industrial school for free blacks, but dismissed the idea as being inefficient and costly. Then, they continued to discuss the many merits of apprenticeships, and throughout the convention minutes, there is an emphasis on education, specifically in the area of mechanical trades. Overall, the convention provides a hopeful message that by increasing the availability of knowledge and opportunities for young, free African Americans, a better reward could await those still suffering under the yoke of slavery upon the advent of their freedom.

== See also ==
- History of African Americans in Philadelphia
