= Lebanon Cemetery =

Historic Cemetery in Philadelphia

- Interactive map of Lebanon Cemetery

Details
- Established: 1849
- Closed: 1903
- Location: Philadelphia, Pennsylvania
- Country: United States
- Size: 11 acres
- Find a Grave: Lebanon Cemetery

Lebanon Cemetery was an African-American cemetery in Philadelphia, Pennsylvania, established in 1849. It was one of only two private African-American cemeteries in Philadelphia at the time. Lebanon Cemetery was condemned in 1899. The bodies were reinterred in 1902 to Eden Cemetery in Collingdale, Pennsylvania, and the cemetery was closed in 1903.

The former location of the cemetery is now the street corner of 19th Street and Snyder Avenue in South Philadelphia.

== History ==
Lebanon Cemetery was chartered on January 24, 1849 by Jacob C. White on the Passyunk Road near present-day Nineteenth Street and Snyder Avenue in South Philadelphia. It was a nonsectarian cemetery designated for African Americans since they were excluded from most of the new rural cemeteries.

The cemetery was a part of the United States National Cemetery System during the American Civil War with a leased lot within the cemetery for soldiers that died in nearby hospitals. 339 African-American veterans of the U.S. Civil War were buried in a reserved section of Lebanon Cemetery and were reinterred to the Philadelphia National Cemetery in 1885.

In the early 1870s, Henry Jones, an affluent African-American man who worked as a caterer, purchased a lot for burial in Mount Moriah Cemetery in Philadelphia. After his death in 1875, cemetery authorities refused to bury him based on his race. A lawsuit was filed against the Mount Moriah Cemetery Association and in 1876 the Pennsylvania Supreme Court ruled that Jones had the right to be buried in the cemetery. During the court case, Jones' body was stored at a burial vault at Lebanon Cemetery. His family had planned to bury him at Lebanon Cemetery but he may have been buried at the Church of St. James the Less in Philadelphia instead.

In 1882, a Philadelphia Press newspaper story sparked a sensational trial after a journalist caught body snatchers from the Jefferson Medical College stealing corpses for use as cadavers by medical students. Four grave robbers, including the cemetery supervisor, were arrested and sentenced to Moyamensing Prison for stealing bodies and providing them to Jefferson Medical College at the rate of $15 a body. After the arrests, it was determined that the body snatching had been going on for nine years and several hundred corpses had been sold to Jefferson Medical College. The reports of bodysnatching caused an uproar in the African-American community in Philadelphia.

The renowned surgeon and Jefferson Medical College anatomy professor, William S. Forbes, was arrested for his role in the grave robbery but was acquitted. Forbes helped write the 1867 Pennsylvania Law named the "Anatomy Act" which called for hospitals, prisons and mental health wards to provide the bodies of those that had no family or funds for burial to medical schools for anatomical research.

Due in part to the Lebanon Cemetery grave robbery scandal, the Pennsylvania Anatomy Act of 1883 was passed which provided for legal means by which medical colleges could obtain cadavers without having to buy them from grave robbers.

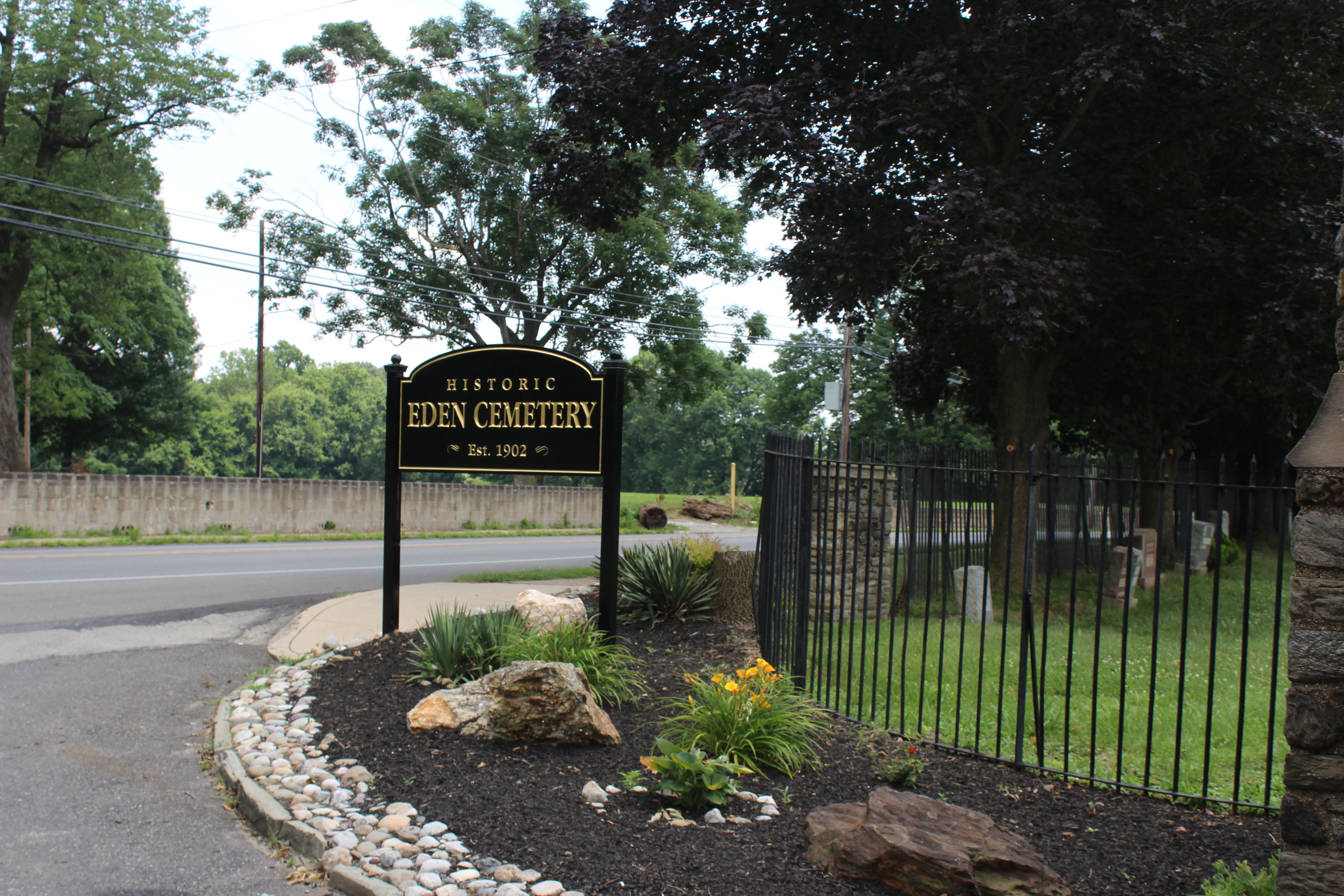
Lebanon Cemetery was condemned in 1899 and the bodies were relocated to Eden Cemetery in Collingdale, Pennsylvania.

By 1889, the cemetery was overcrowded and in disrepair. Expansion of the city began to erode the size of the cemetery. By 1900, Lebanon Cemetery had shrunk from the original 11 acres down to 6 with over 17,000 corpses. In 1899, the city condemned the cemetery and in 1902 relocated the bodies to Eden Cemetery in Collingdale, Pennsylvania. Lebanon Cemetery was closed in 1903.

== Notable interments ==
- Aaron Anderson (1811-1886), Landsman USS Wyandank, US Civil War Congressional Medal of Honor recipient for heroic actions on Mattox Creek, VA, 17 MAR 1865.
- John C. Bowers (1811–1873), entrepreneur, organist and abolitionist
- Octavius Valentine Catto (1839–1871), civil rights leader and baseball pioneer
- Rachel Cliff (1805–1885), delegate to the 1855 Colored Convention
- Emilie Davis (1839–1889), writer
- Nathaniel W. Depee (1812–1868), activist and abolitionist
- Absalom Jones (1746–1818), abolitionist and clergyman, buried at the African Episcopal Church of St. Thomas in Philadelphia, Pennsylvania. Reinterred in 1887 to Lebanon Cemetery when the church was demolished.
- Grace A. Mapps (c. 1835–1897), educator, administrator and poet
