= Nathaniel W. Depee =

American activist and abolitionist(1812–1868)

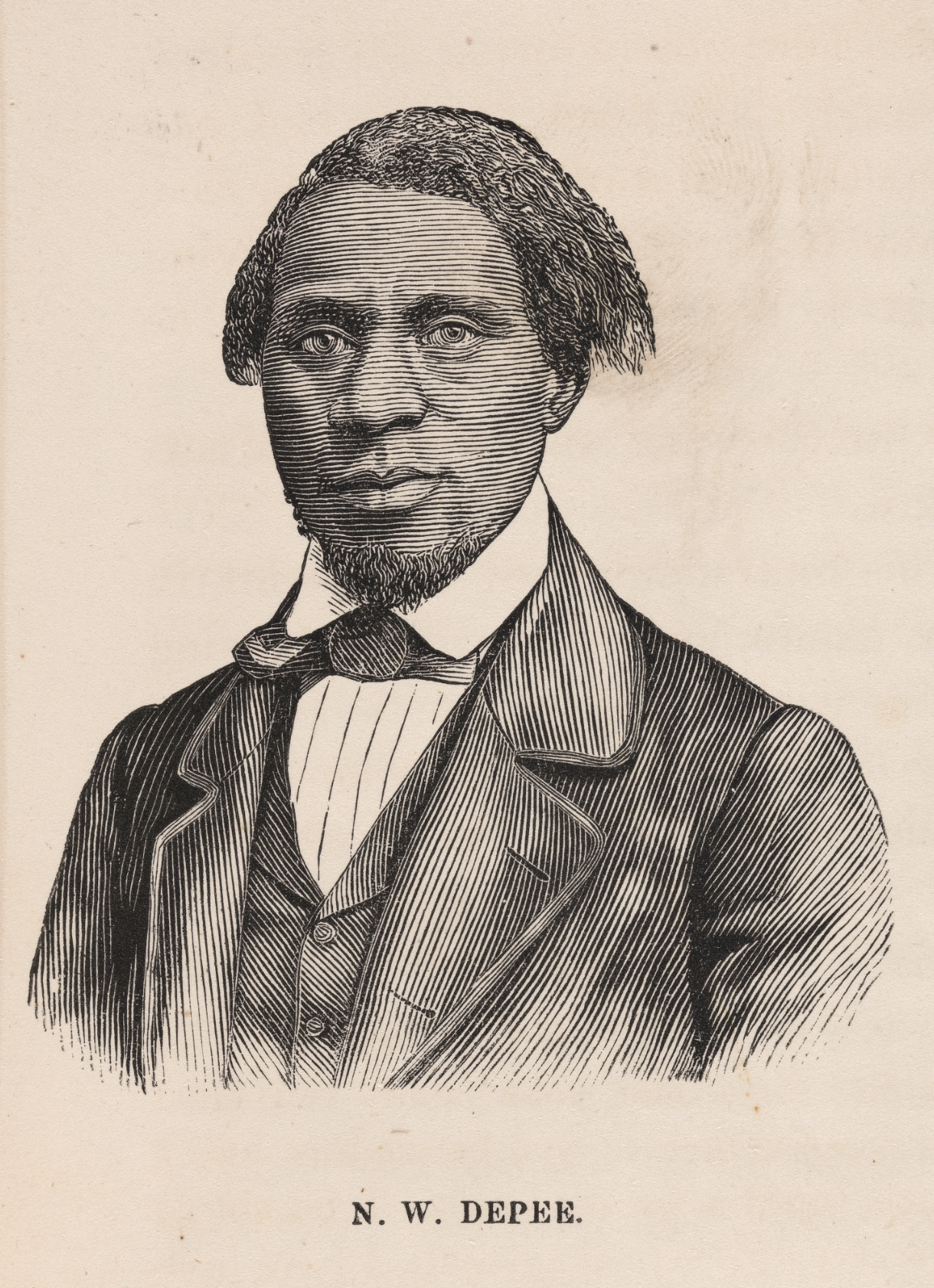
- Depee's portrait (c. 1900) from the National Portrait Gallery, Smithsonian Institution
- Born: 1812; Philadelphia, Pennsylvania, U.S.
- Died: 19 June 1868 (aged 55–56); Philadelphia, Pennsylvania, U.S.
- Burial place: Eden Cemetery
- Other name: N. W. Depee
- Occupations: Activist, abolitionist, merchant tailor

Nathaniel W. Depee (1812 – June 19, 1868) was an American activist, abolitionist, and merchant tailor. He was active in the Underground Railroad, and in Black politics in Philadelphia in the 1830s through 1860s.

== Biography ==
Nathaniel W. Depee was born in 1812 in Philadelphia, Pennsylvania, U.S.

In 1845, Depee helped to form the Colored American National Society, an organization that helped connect the Colored Conventions Movement and William Whipper's American Moral Reform Society. In 1855, Depee served as a delegate at the 1855 National Colored Convention in Philadelphia.

Depee was one of five members of the acting committee for the Vigilant Association of Philadelphia, others included William Still, Jacob C. White, Passmore Williamson, and Charles Wise. His home at 334 South Street was listed as one of the Underground Railroad stops.

He died on June 19, 1868, in Philadelphia, and was buried initially at Lebanon Cemetery, and later re-interred to Eden Cemetery.

== See also ==
- History of African Americans in Philadelphia
