= Grace A. Mapps =

American educator, administrator and poet (c. 1835–1897)

- Born: c. 1835; Little Egg Harbor Township, New Jersey, U.S.
- Died: June 11, 1897 (aged 62); Burlington, New Jersey, U.S.
- Resting place: Lebanon Cemetery, Philadelphia
- Education: McGrawville College, graduated 1852
- Occupations: Educator, administrator, poet
- Employer(s): Institute for Colored Youth, 1852/3–1864/5
- Organization: Society of Friends
- Relatives: Sarah Mapps Douglass (cousin); Grace Douglass (aunt)

Grace A. Mapps (c. 1835 – June 11, 1897) was an American educator, administrator and poet, who may have been the first African-American woman to graduate with a four-year college degree. Mapps graduated from New-York Central College at McGrawville in 1852, but the type of degree she received (if any) is not recorded. As such, Mary Jane Patterson is widely regarded as the first African-American woman to graduate with a four-year bachelor's degree. Understandings of Mapps' achievements are also complicated by regular confusion with relatives Sarah Mapps Douglass and Grace Douglass, both of whom were prominent activists and educators.

== Early life ==
Grace A. Mapps is believed to have been born in Little Egg Harbor, New Jersey, the daughter of David Mapps, a wealthy mariner and businessman, and Grace, whose maiden name is unknown. Her parents became Quakers in 1799, and were respected within the Society of Friends, welcoming visitors to their home including noted anti-slavery editor Charles Osborn, and British minister Thomas Shillitoe. The family were known for their hospitality, and mentioned elsewhere as being "noted for [their] acquirements in music, literature and art", though many black Americans were not received warmly as members of the Society of Friends. Grace Mapps and Sarah Mapps Douglass were described as having taken up "the challenge to be seen as equals within the Religious Society of Friends." Samuel Ringgold Ward, an African-American abolitionist, wrote of the Society of Friends that:

They will aid in giving us a partial education - but never in a Quaker school, beside their own children. Whatever they do for us savors of pity, and is done at arm's length.

Grace Mapps died in 1833, and David Mapps remarried in 1835. His second wife, Anna Douglass Mapps, was a teacher. An anecdote told of Isaac Hopper, abolitionist and participant in the Underground Railroad, referred specifically to the Mapps family:

On the occasion of the annual gathering in Philadelphia they came with other members of the Society to share the hospitality of his (i. e., Isaac T. Hopper's) house. A question arose in the family whether Friends of white complexion would object to eating with them. "Leave that to me," said the master of the household. Accordingly when the time arrived, he announced it thus: "Friends, dinner is now ready. David Maps and his wife will come with me; and as I like to have all accommodated, those who object to dining with them can wait till they have done." The guests smiled, and all seated themselves at the table.

In this recollection, the Mapps family are referred to as "the only colored members" at the annual meeting, and African-American Quakers are noted as a rarity.

== Education ==
Grace A. Mapps attended McGrawville College, graduating from a four-year course of study in 1852. Although unquestionably one of the first black women to do so, the type of degree she received, if any at all, is not documented. As such, Mary Jane Patterson, who graduated from Oberlin College in 1862, is widely thought to be the first black woman in the United States to earn a bachelor's degree. Unclear documentation of degree types at the time, especially for women and African Americans in higher education, has complicated the claims made for various black women as being "first" to earn a bachelor's degree. Another woman, Lucy Stanton Day Sessions, is now thought by some to be the first black woman to graduate with a degree, but the women's course at Oberlin from which she graduated did not award a bachelor's. Mapps' case is similar, having graduated from a four-year college, but without clear evidence as to whether she was awarded a Bachelor of Arts, some other degree, or no degree at all.

== Institute for Colored Youth ==
After graduating from McGrawville, Mapps became a teacher at the Quaker-sponsored school for African Americans, the Institute for Colored Youth, which opened on Lombard Street, Philadelphia in 1852. She became the "Principal Teacher of the Female Department" at the institute, the first woman to head the department. She was said to have been well versed in Greek, and known to teach it. Writing in 1936, Quaker historian Henry J. Cadbury described Mapps as:

a highly educated woman, perhaps the first colored woman to graduate from a bona fide college, which she did from McGrawville, New York, in 1852. Like her step-mother [Anna Douglass Mapps], she became a teacher. In 1853 she was principal of the Girls' Department of the Friends' high school, "The Institute for Coloured Youth," where she remained until 1864, when she resigned to take care of her mother, who lived in Burlington, New Jersey. She died in 1891. She is said to have been able to teach Greek. Contributions from her pen were published in the Anglo-African Magazine for 1859.

One admiring student of Mapps was Frances Rollin Whipper, who described Mapps and her cousin – fellow teacher Sarah Mapps Douglass – as "pioneers of high culture". The two are also described by Eric Gardner as having been instrumental in helping to "make the institute into the flowering center of Philadelphia's free black community" and in encouraging "parents to become more active in their children's education".

After Mapps' departure from the Institute for Colored Youth, she was replaced by Fanny Jackson Coppin.

== Poetry ==
Mapps' successor at the institute, Fanny Jackson Coppin, described Mapps in her reminiscences as being "a frequent contributor to several periodicals prior to the Civil War", and as having "a literary rating of the highest order". Mapps was clearly a respected poet, although her work - published largely in African-American periodicals, has not been collected. One poem which appeared in the magazine mentioned by Cadbury was "Lines", published in The Anglo-African in 1859. The poem takes up the subjects of death and immortality, and uses an eight-line stanza form. Jessie Carney Smith describes it as reflective "of the somber subject", and adhering to "traditional notions of Christian piety".

== Death and legacy ==
Grace A. Mapps died aged 62 on June 11, 1897, in Burlington, New Jersey. She was buried at Lebanon Cemetery. Jessie Carney Smith has written that:

As the first black woman to earn a college degree, a respected teacher and a leader in education, and a poet who contributed to the leading African American journals of her day, Grace A. Mapps won the regard and admiration of her peers. She was indeed a notable figure whose contributions to African American culture merit further study and recognition.
