= Frank Novak (architect) =

American architect

Frank Joseph Novak Sr.
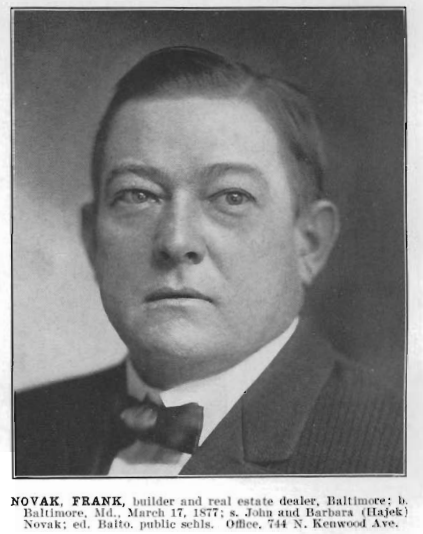
- Born: March 17, 1877; Baltimore, Maryland
- Died: October 11, 1945 (aged 68)
- Occupations: Architect and builder
- Relatives: Frank Novak Jr., Gertrude Herr

Frank Joseph Novak Sr. (March 17, 1877 – October 11, 1945) was an American architect, real estate developer and builder. Active in Baltimore, he was known for constructing many of East Baltimore's famous rowhouses with marbled steps. He was the most prominent builder in Baltimore's Czech-American community. His prolific construction of housing for working-class immigrants earned him the nickname, "The Two-Story King of East Baltimore".

== Early life ==
Novak was born in Baltimore, Maryland, the son of immigrants from Bohemia in what is now the Czech Republic (formerly part of Austria-Hungary). His parents had immigrated to Baltimore two years prior to his birth. He had an adopted son, Frank Novak Jr., and an adopted daughter, Gertrude Herr.

== Career ==
Novak began to study as a carpenter's apprentice at the age of 13. In 1914, Novak established the Frank Novak Realty Company. He predominantly built homes for Czech, Slovak, and other Eastern European Catholic immigrants in Baltimore. Many row houses built by Novak are part of the East Monument Historic District. The establishment of St. Wenceslaus Catholic Church and the St. Wenceslaus Lyceum, followed by Novak and other builders constructing houses for Bohemian immigrants on nearby streets, cemented the neighborhood as Baltimore's Little Bohemia. Novak built a home purchased by the Czech-American inventor of screen painting, William Oktavec, which Oktavec converted into a grocery store.

Many of the houses in the community of Ednor Gardens-Lakeside were built by Novak. Actually two neighborhoods, Novak built Lakeside. Constructed in the 1920s, these were Novak's first detached single family houses. The Frank Novak Realty Company built the western portion of Coldstream Homestead Montebello in northeastern Baltimore. Novak donated the land for Herring Run Park to the City of Baltimore.

Prior to the passage of the Fair Housing Act of 1968, racially restrictive covenants were used in Baltimore to exclude African-Americans and other minority groups. A 1923 article in the Baltimore Sun mentions that Novak built "restricted" houses in the Montebello neighborhood. A 1926 advertisement in the Baltimore Sun describes Novak's Lakeside development as a "carefully restricted suburban home development".

== Death ==
Novak died on October 11, 1945. He left almost all of his estate of over $500,000 to the Roman Catholic Church and Johns Hopkins Hospital. Novak specified in his will that he deliberately avoided giving more of his estate to his adopted children, claiming that they were already adequately cared for and claiming ill will from his son. Other family members and relatives were provided for in the will. Frank Novak Jr. contested the will in court.

== Gallery ==
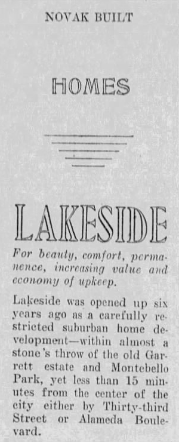
A September 26, 1926 advertisement in the Baltimore Sun for a racially restricted "Novak Built" development in Lakeside, Baltimore.

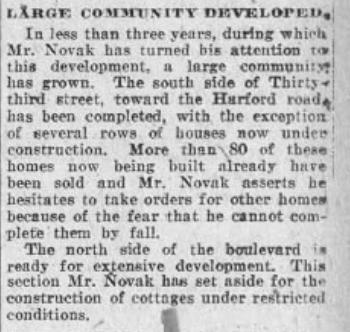
April 15, 1923 article in the Baltimore Sun about a racially restricted development in Montebello built by Frank Novak.

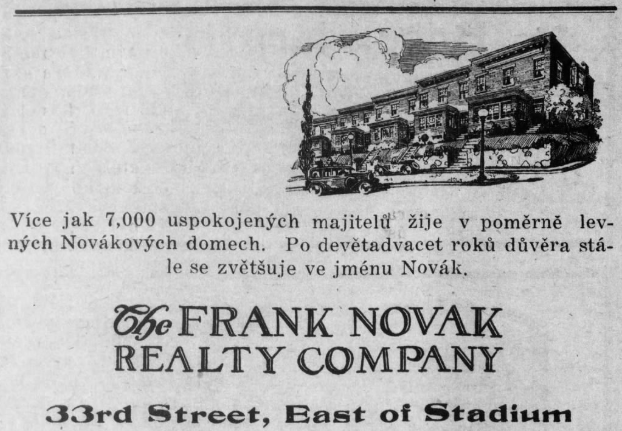
Frank Novak Realty Company advertisement in the Telegraf, December 28, 1928.

== See also ==
- History of Czechs in Baltimore
- Housing segregation in the United States
