= Patrick Mullen (Medal of Honor) =

United States Navy Medal of Honor recipient

Patrick Mullin
- Born: May 6, 1844; Ireland
- Died: February 14, 1897 (aged 52)
- Military career
- Allegiance: United States of America
- Branch: United States Navy
- Rank: Boatswain's Mate
- Nickname: Patrick Mullen
- Units: USS Wyandank (1847), USS Don (1862)
- Awards: Medal of Honor (2),

Patrick Mullen (born Patrick Mullin; May 6, 1844 – February 14, 1897) is one of only 19 servicemen to twice receive the Medal of Honor. He was a member of the United States Navy.

== Biography ==
Patrick Mullen was born May 6, 1844, in Ireland and joined the United States Navy from Baltimore, Maryland. While stationed aboard the USS Wyandank he received the Medal of Honor for his actions during a boat expedition up Mattox Creek, March 17, 1865.

== Medal of Honor citation ==

FIRST AWARD

Rank and Organization:
Boatswain's Mate, U.S. Navy. Entered service at: Baltimore, Md. Birth: Baltimore, Md. G.O. No.: 59, June 22, 1865.

Citation:

Served as boatswain's mate on board the U.S.S. Wyandank during a boat expedition up Mattox Creek, March 17, 1865. Rendering gallant assistance to his commanding officer, Mullen, lying on his back, loaded the howitzer and then fired so carefully as to kill and wound many rebels, causing their retreat.

SECOND AWARD

Rank and Organization:

G.O. No.: 62, June 29, 1865.

Citation:

Served as boatswain's mate on board the U.S.S. Don, 1 May 1865. Engaged in picking up the crew of picket launch No. 6, which had swamped. Mullen, seeing an officer who was at that time no longer able to keep up and was below the surface of the water, jumped overboard and brought the officer to the boat, thereby rescuing him from drowning, which brave action entitled him to wear a bar on the medal he had already received at Mattox Creek, 17 March 1865.

== See also ==
- List of Medal of Honor recipients
- List of American Civil War Medal of Honor recipients: M–P
