= Rachel Cliff (politician) =

- Born: 1806; New Jersey, U.S.
- Died: June 28, 1885 (aged 78–79); Philadelphia, Pennsylvania, U.S.
- Occupation: Janitress
- Known for: Delegate to 1855 Colored Convention
- Spouse: Isaac Cliff
- Children: 1

Rachel Cliff (1806–1885) was one of two women to serve as an official delegate to the Philadelphia meeting of the 1855 Colored Convention, along with Elizabeth Armstrong. She worked as a "janitrix", or janitress, in Philadelphia.

== Early life ==
Rachel Cliff was born in New Jersey, the home-state of both of her parents, in 1806. She moved to Philadelphia, Pennsylvania and married Isaac Cliff, a barber.

== Activism ==
Cliff was involved with the Colored Conventions Movement, a movement composed of free and fugitive African Americans that sought to advance African American rights in law, labor, and education.

=== 1855 Colored National Convention ===
Cliff was a delegate at the 1855 National Colored Convention in Philadelphia, one in a series of conventions comprising the Colored Conventions Movement. She was one of only two female delegates from Pennsylvania. During the 1855 convention, delegates discussed the creation of an Industrial School for African Americans, heard a report from the Committee on Mechanical Branches among the Colored People of the Free States, and issued an address on behalf of those held in slavery.

== Personal life ==
Rachel Cliff had a son, John Cliff, in 1839 or 1840. Rachel Cliff was married to Isaac Cliff, who predeceased her. Rachel was widowed some time before 1874, when she is listed in the Philadelphia City Directory as a "janitrix," a female janitor. She was later listed as keeping house with two of her nephews, a musician and a waiter, in 1880.

== Death ==
Rachel Cliff died in Philadelphia, Pennsylvania, on June 28, 1885, at the 24th Ward Home for Aged and Infirm Colored Persons and was interred on June 30 in Lebanon Cemetery.
