= USS Don =

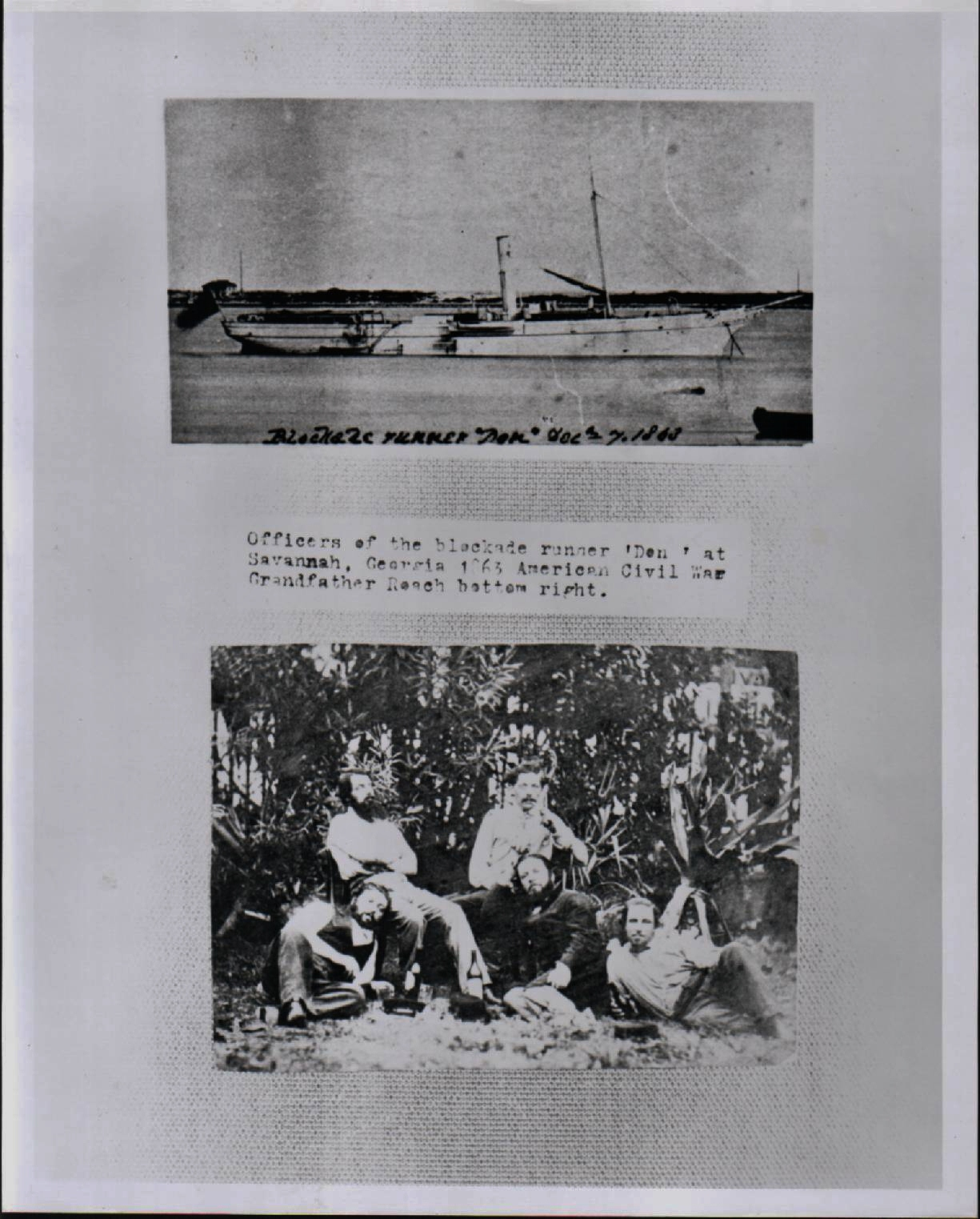

History

United States
- Name: USS Don
- Acquired: 21 April 1864
- Commissioned: 15 May 1864
- Decommissioned: 18 May 1868
- Captured: captured by the Union Navy, 4 March 1862
- Fate: Sold, 29 August 1868

General characteristics
- Type: Cargo ship
- Displacement: 390 long tons (400 t)
- Length: 162 ft (49 m)
- Beam: 23 ft (7.0 m)
- Draft: 6 ft (1.8 m)
- Propulsion: Steam engine, screw-propelled
- Complement: 94
- Armament: 2 × 20-pounder Dahlgren guns; 6 × 24-pounder guns

USS Don was a captured British steam-operated cargo ship acquired by the Union Navy from the prize court during the American Civil War.

She was put into service by the Union Navy to patrol navigable waterways of the Confederacy to prevent the South from trading with other countries.

== Service history ==
The British blockade runner Don was captured off Beaufort, North Carolina on 4 March 1862 by Pequot, and sent to Boston, Massachusetts for adjudication. She was purchased by the Navy Department and sent to Boston Navy Yard to be fitted for service, arriving on 21 April 1864. Don put out from Boston on 15 May 1864, under the command of Acting Master S. B. Gregory, to join the Potomac Flotilla. She patrolled the Potomac River and other waters in and bordering Virginia with her base at Washington Navy Yard until 26 September 1865, when she sailed for New York City. Don remained at New York until 28 October, when she joined the North Atlantic Blockade Squadron to cruise on the coasts of the Atlantic and Gulf of Mexico, and in the West Indies. She returned to New York on 11 May 1868, was decommissioned there on 18 May 1868, and sold on 29 August.
