= USS Wyandank =

Cargo ship of the United States Navy

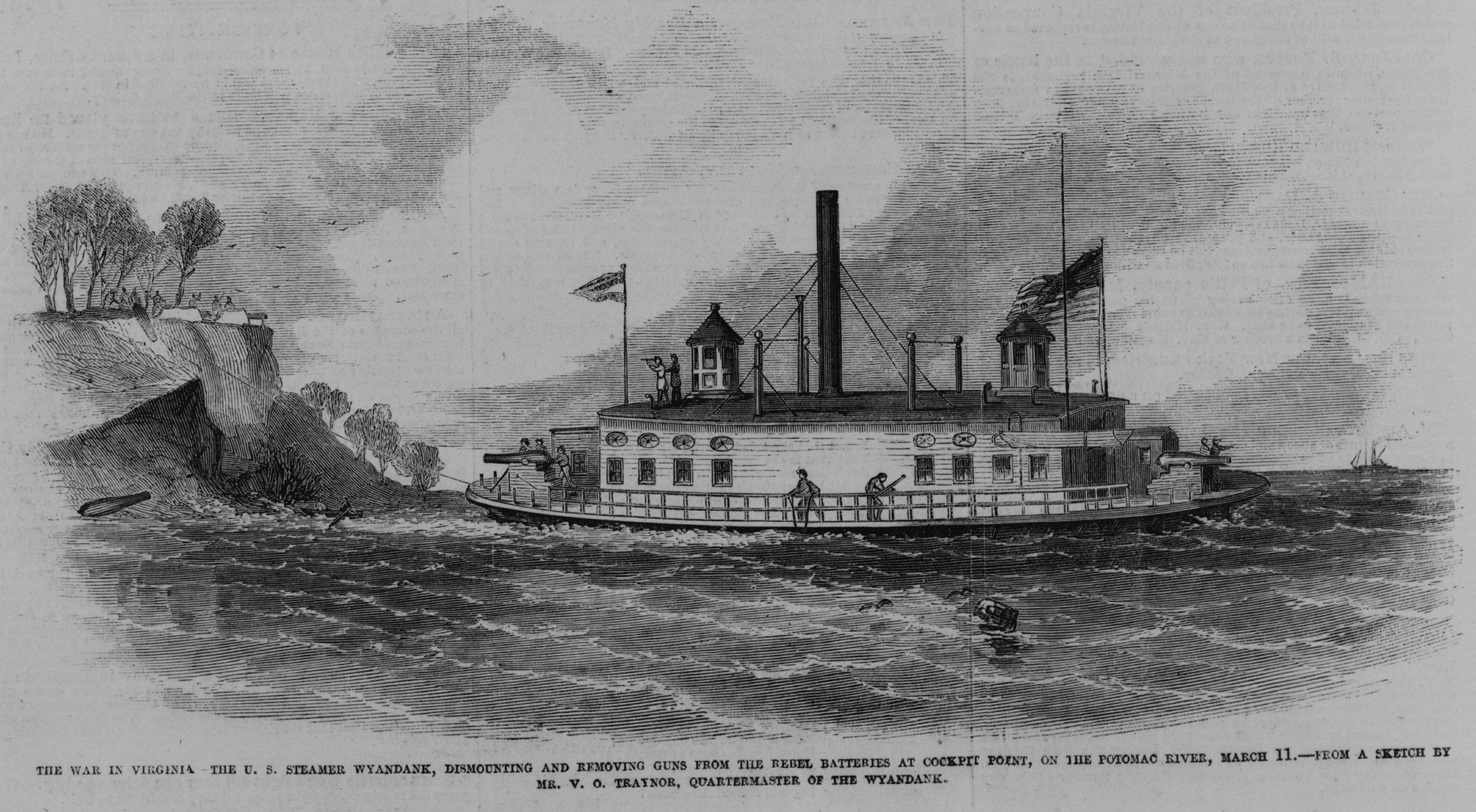
- The war in Virginia; The U.S. steamer Wyandank, dismounting and removing guns from the Rebel batteries at Cockpit Point, on the Potomac River, March 11, 1862

History

United States
- Launched: 1847
- Acquired: 12 September 1861
- In service: 1861
- Fate: Broken up, 1879

General characteristics
- Displacement: 400 tons
- Length: 132 ft 5 in (40.36 m)
- Beam: 31 ft 5 in (9.58 m)
- Depth of hold: 10 ft 10 in (3.30 m)
- Propulsion: steam engine; side wheel-propelled
- Armament: two 12-pounder guns

USS Wyandank was a steamer acquired by the Union Navy during the American Civil War. She was used by the Union Navy as a storeship and as a barracks ship in support of the Union Navy blockade of Confederate waterways.

== Service history ==
Wyandank—a wooden-hulled, sidewheel ferryboat built at New York City in 1847 and sometimes documented as Wyandanck—was acquired by the Union Navy on 12 September 1861 from the Union Ferry Co. of Brooklyn, New York. Wyandank was used during the Civil War as storeship for the Potomac Flotilla. After hostilities ended, Wyandank served at Annapolis, Maryland, into the 1870s as a floating barracks for United States Marines assigned to the United States Naval Academy. She was broken up there in 1879.

== See also ==
- Union Blockade
