= Coldstream-Homestead-Montebello, Baltimore =

Neighborhood in Baltimore, Maryland

Coldstream Homestead Montebello
- Neighborhood
- Nickname: C-H-M
- Interactive map of Coldstream Homestead Montebello
- Coordinates: 39°19′24″N 76°35′42″W
- Country: United States of America
- State: Maryland
- City: Baltimore
- First settled: 1870s

Population
  - Total: 7,223

- Coldstream Homestead Montebello Historic District
- U.S. National Register of Historic Places
- U.S. Historic district
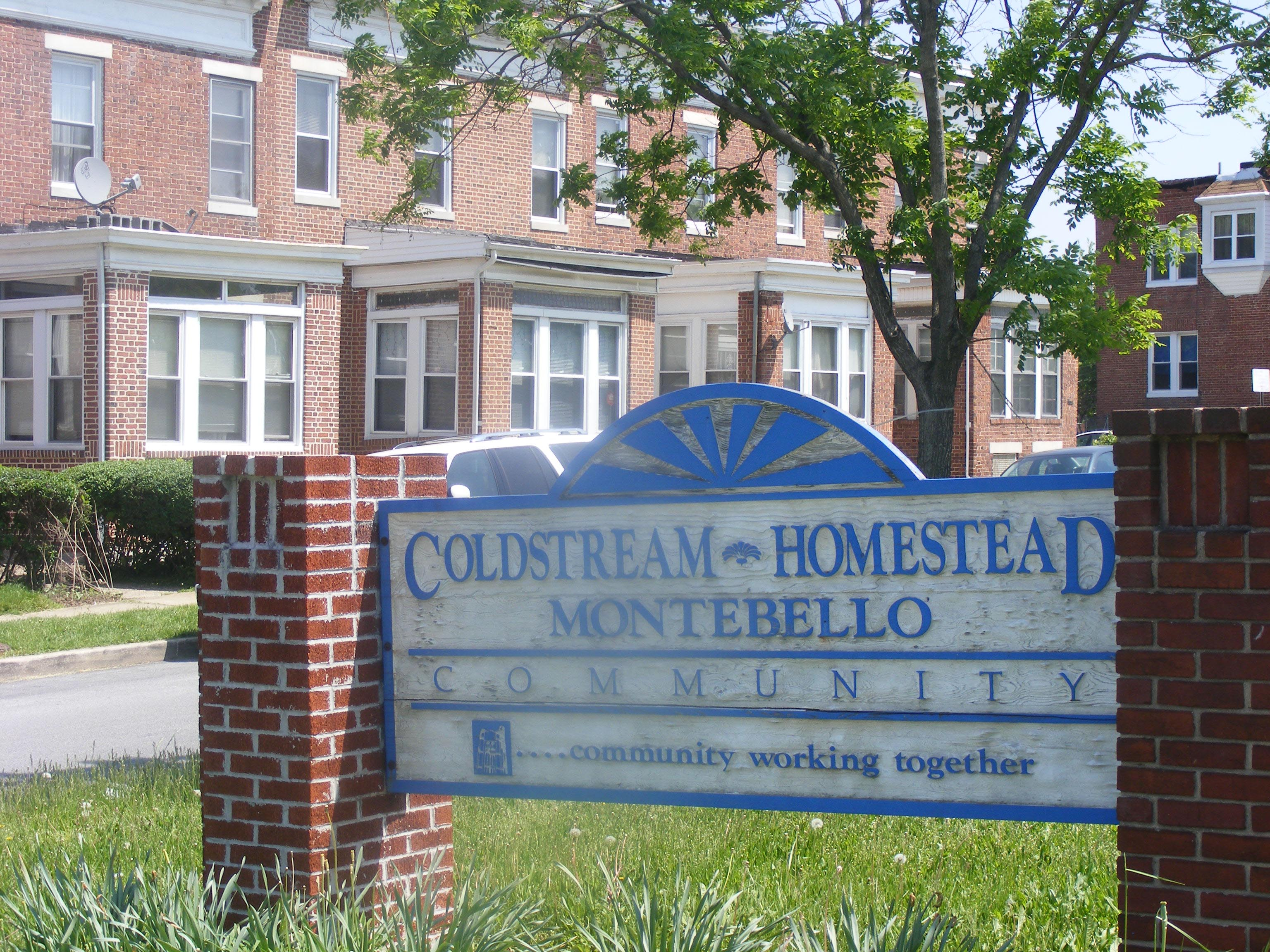

- Location within Baltimore Location within Maryland Location within the United States
- Location: Roughly bounded by The Alameda, Kennedy & Kirk Aves., Harford Rd., E. 32nd & E. 33rd Sts., Baltimore, Maryland
- Coordinates: 39°19′24″N 76°35′42″W
- Area: 0 acres (0 ha)
- Built: 1908-1937
- Architect: Frank Novak, Dr. Theodore Cooke
- Architectural style: Italianate, Colonial Revival, Classical Revival, Late Gothic Revival
- NRHP reference No.: 13000848
- Added to NRHP: October 23, 2013

The Coldstream-Homestead-Montebello community, often abbreviated to C-H-M, is a neighborhood in northeastern Baltimore, Maryland. A portion of the neighborhood has been listed on the National Register of Historic Places as the Coldstream Homestead Montebello Historic District, recognized for the development of a more suburban style of rowhouses.

The neighborhood captures its name from the nineteenth century grandeur of Baltimore's elaborate summer estates and small country villages along radiating turnpikes from the center of the city to the outlying major towns. Coldstream-Homestead-Montebello is bounded by Loch Raven Road to the west, East 33rd Street to the north, Hartford Road to the east and East 25th Street to the south.

== History ==
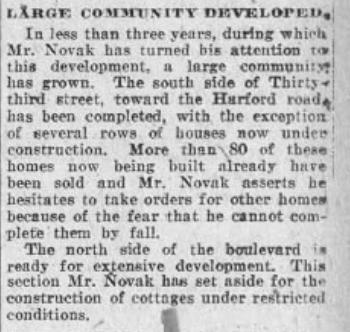
An April 15, 1923, article in the Baltimore Sun about Frank Novak's racially restricted development in Montebello

The neighborhood gets its name from three 19th century estates, William Patterson's "Cold Stream," Thomas Gorsuch's "Homestead" and, John W. Garrett's "Montebello." Gorsuch's tract was purchased in 1731. The neighborhood is also made up of land from Johns Hopkins' "Clifton Park" and Horace Abbott's other tract named "Abbottston."

Baltimore City College was built in the 1870s on the site of "Abbottston." Horace Abbott was the famous owner of ironworks in the Canton waterfront of southeast Baltimore. Previously owned by Peter Cooper, these ironworks are where iron plate was rolled for the revolutionary U.S.S. Monitor ironclad ship in the American Civil War. Later the estate passed to Abbott's daughter and son-in-law, of the Gilman family, at Johns Hopkins University and was known as the Gilman-Cate estate until its razing in 1924. Abbottston Street and Abbottston Elementary School in the neighborhood are reminders of its memory.

While development of the neighborhood began in the mid-1860s, it was not until the 1920s that the neighborhood was more fully developed with the daylight rowhomes that predominate the housing stock today. Frank Novak and E. J. Gallagher were two of the most prolific developers in the neighborhood. A 1923 article in the Baltimore Sun mentions that the real estate developer Novak built racially "restricted" houses in Montebello.

In 1950, this neighborhood was rated the #1 neighborhood in the city of Baltimore. However, since the race riots, and the "white flight", this neighborhood has been notorious for a decline in income and an increase in crime, specifically blue collar crime.

== Location ==
The neighbourhood is located in northeastern Baltimore, is bounded by Harford Road on the east; Loch Raven Boulevard on the west; 25th Street on the south; and 32nd and 33rd Street on the north and includes Baltimore's scenic Lake Montebello, a holding pond for the city's Department of Public Works regional water system and the Montebello Filtration Plant (constructed 1913) to the immediate north.

== Education ==
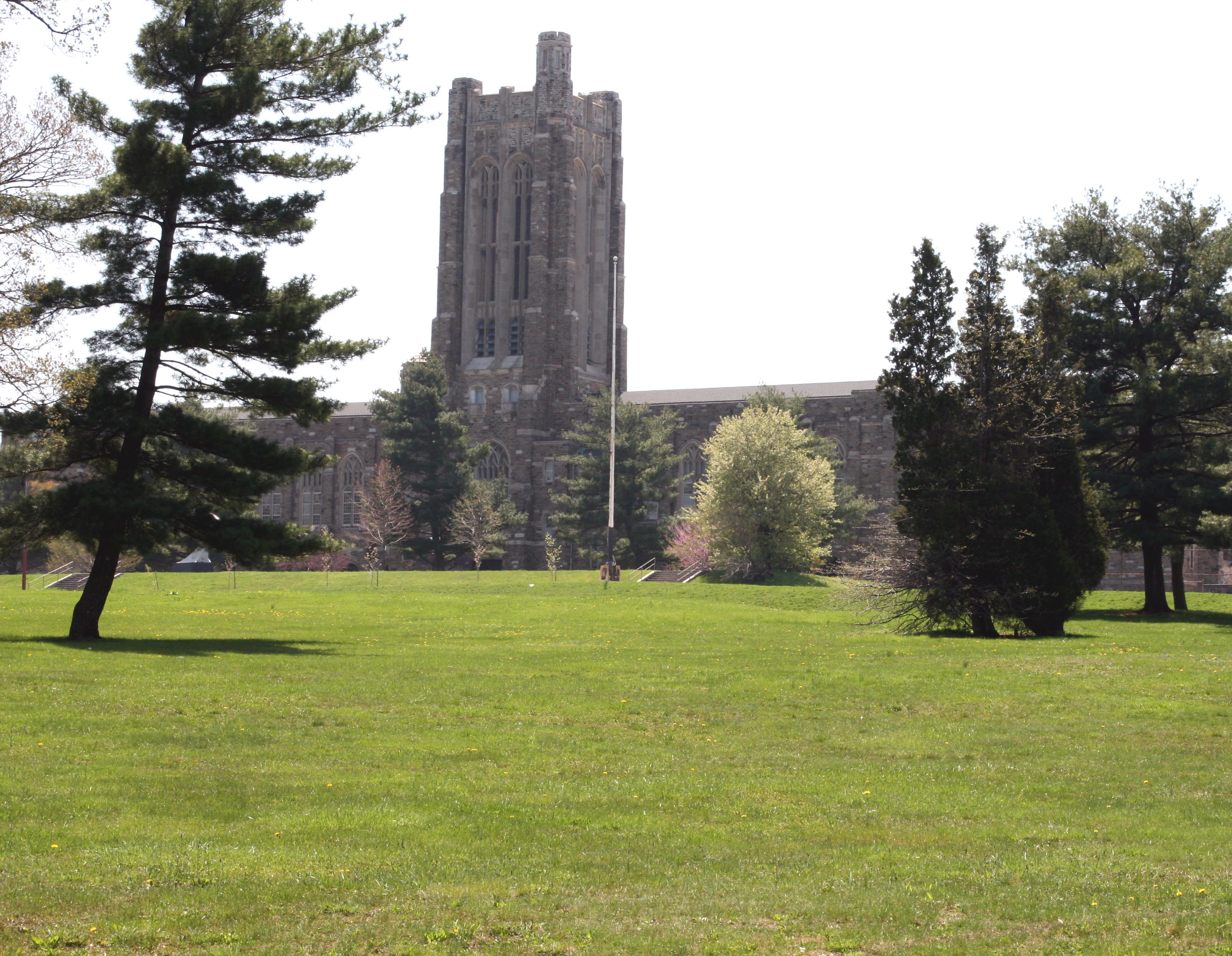
Baltimore City College sits in the heart of the CHM community

Baltimore City College is a magnet academic-specialized selective public high school for the humanities, liberal arts, social studies, and is also the third oldest public secondary school in America. It was founded for young men in downtown Baltimore on the former Courtland Street (now Saint Paul Place/Preston Gardens area) in 1839, and re-located to its fifth site at the present Collegiate Gothic landmark building in 1928. Nicknamed "The Castle on the Hill", Baltimore City College, which has been co-educational since 1979, is on a 39-acre campus with a 150-foot stone tower on one of the highest spots and scenic views in the city.

Located to the west across Loch Raven Boulevard is the former Eastern High School. Founded in 1844 for young women, it was built in 1938 of brick in a Tudor English Gothic Revival style. Facing the 33rd Street Boulevard, it was inspired by the garden parkway plans for Baltimore in the early 20th century of Frederick Law Olmsted, famed landscape architect of New York City's Central Park. Closed in 1984 and merged with nearby Lake Clifton High School in Clifton Park off Harford Road, the landmark Eastern building was renovated as offices by the Johns Hopkins University and Medical Institutions.

== Sport and recreation ==
Across to the northwest is the former site of Municipal Stadium (also known as the Baltimore Stadium) built in 1921-22 for football and rebuilt in 1950 with an upper deck added as Memorial Stadium for the football Baltimore Colts and the baseball Baltimore Orioles professional teams. The Memorial Stadium was discontinued by the Colts when they moved to Indianapolis in 1984 and only briefly afterwards used by several other teams such as the Canadian Football League's Baltimore Stallions and the transferred NFL franchise Baltimore Ravens from Cleveland in 1996 to 1998 and also by the Orioles when Oriole Park at Camden Yards was built in 1992. It was razed in 2004 after much controversy, and replaced by a mixed development called Stadium Place, consisting of housing and facilities for the YMCA of Central Maryland.

These two institutions have an important impact on the neighboring C-H-M communities.

== Demographics ==
The 2000 United States Census General Demographic Characteristics of CHM show that there are 8,750 residents of which 99% are African American. There were 3,265 housing units of which 80% were single unit-attached (rowhouses). 84.5 of all housing units were occupied with 55.9% of them being owner-occupied. Nearly 32% of the residents are enrolled in school (grades pre-k to 12) and 60% of the residents have attained a high school diploma or better. The median family income is (dollars) $27,471.

== Community ==
Residents of C-H-M actively work to better their neighborhood through the Coldstream-Homestead-Montebello Community Corporation which meets every second Thursday at 7 p.m. on the campus of the Baltimore City College (B.C.C.), at 33rd Street and The Alameda. The C-H-M offices are located in the former Music/Industrial Shops/Power Plant annex of 1958 across the faculty upper parking lot.

=== Coldstream-Homestead-Montebello Community Corporation ===
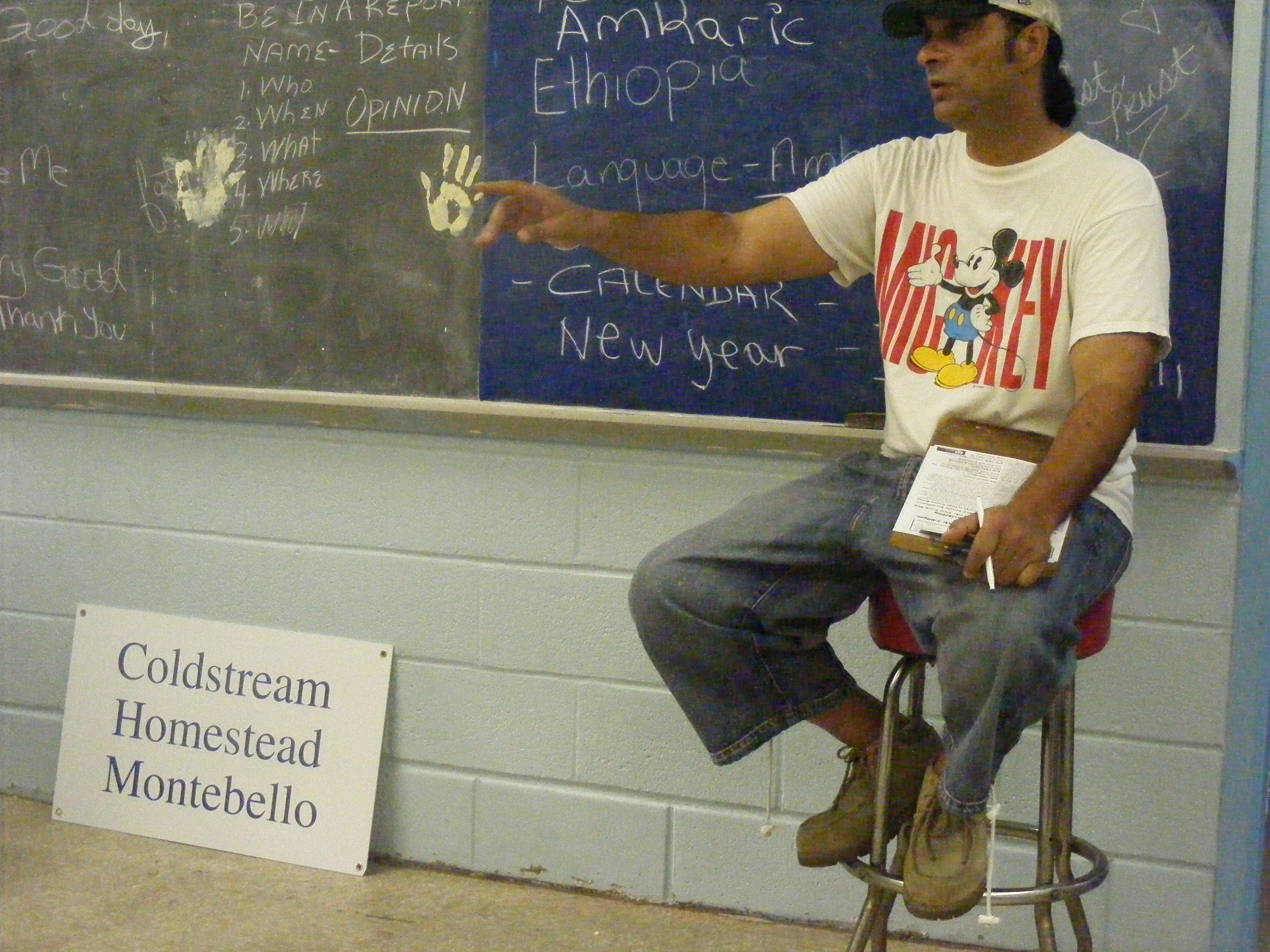
CHM Executive Director Mark Washington directs July 2009 meeting

In addition to meeting on a regular basis, holding community clean-ups and providing its residents with City government related information, the Coldstream-Homestead-Montebello community corporation also provides a variety of services and programs for its residents. The corporation provides housing counselors for its residents, a summer film series for families, women's self-defense classes, organized walks for seniors and the coordination free services for its residents. Coldstream-Homestead-Montebello community residents qualify for various programs including Project Lightbulb those that provide free energy saving lightbulbs, showerheads, kitchen faucets and water heater wraps.

=== Recurring events ===
- First Thursdays, Community Corporation Board Meeting
- Second Thursdays at 7 pm, Community Meeting
- Fourth Thursdays at 7 pm, Citizens on Patrol Walk
- First and Third Fridays at 10 am, 6X Express Senior Shuttle
- Second Fridays at 10 am, Senior Meeting
- Fourth Fridays at 10 am, Lifelong Gathering
- Every Friday during the summer (sundown), Movies in the Park

== Government representation ==
Electoral District	Elected Official	Level
7th Congressional District	Kweisi Mfume	Congress
Legislative District 43A	Senate: Mary Washington Delegates: Regina Boyce, Elizabeth Embry	Maryland General Assembly
Legislative District 45	Senate: Cory McCray Delegate: Stephanie Smith, Jackie Addison, Caylin Young	Maryland General Assembly
14th Council District	Odette Ramos	Baltimore City Council
