= Ednor Gardens-Lakeside, Baltimore =

Community in Baltimore, Maryland

- Ednor Gardens Historic District
- U.S. National Register of Historic Places
- U.S. Historic district
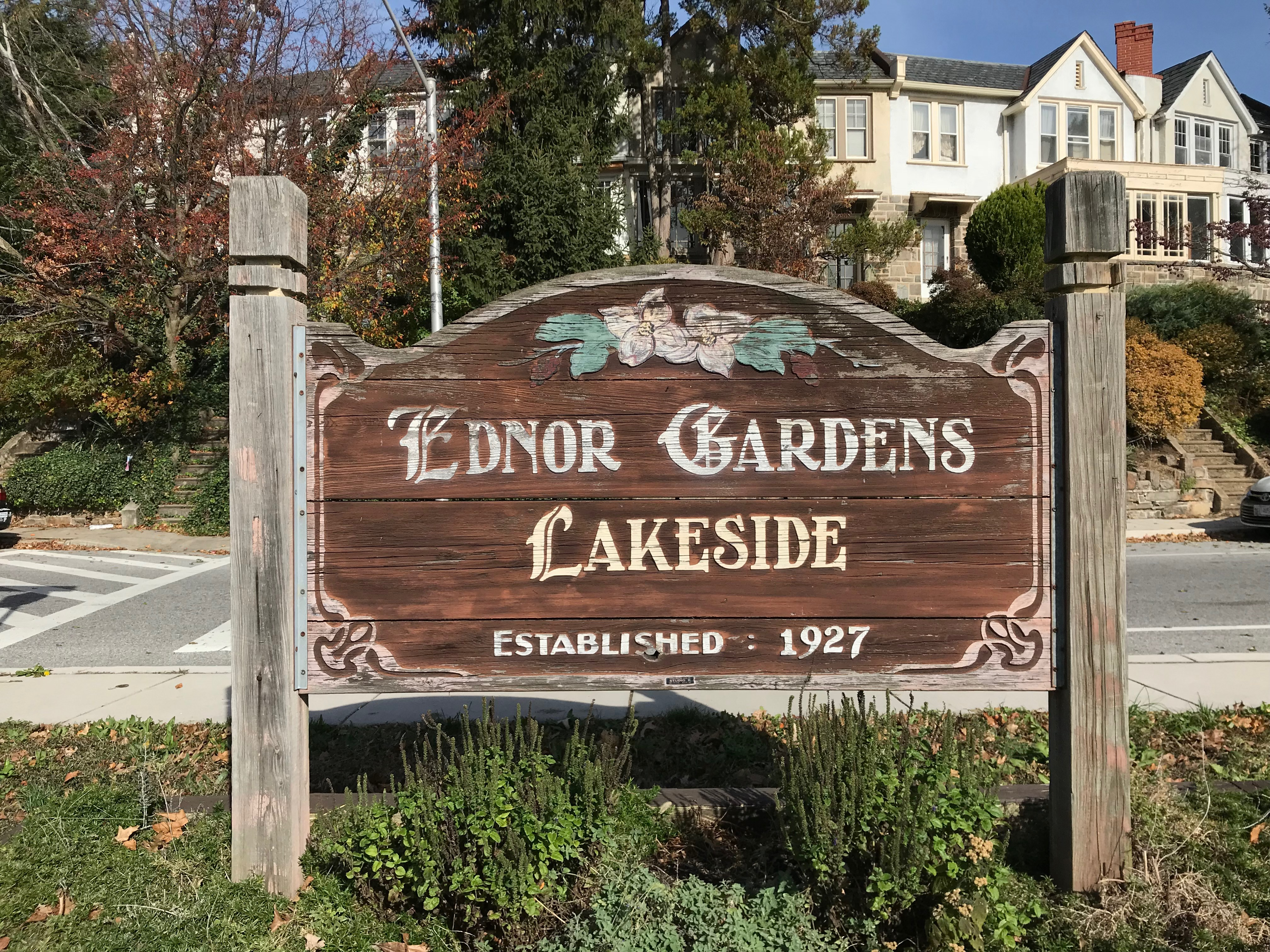
- Gateway sign, Ednor Gardens-Lakeside, E. 36th Street and Ellerslie Avenue, Baltimore, MD 21218

- Location within Baltimore Location within Maryland Location within the United States
- Location: Roughly bounded by Ellerslie Ave., 36th St., The Alameda, Andover Rd. and Chestnut Hill Ave., Baltimore, Maryland
- Coordinates: 39°20′09″N 76°36′01″W
- Area: 82 acres (33 ha)
- Architect: Gallagher, Edward Jr.; Gallagher Realty Company
- Architectural style: Tudor Revival, Colonial Revival
- NRHP reference No.: 03001373
- Added to NRHP: March 30, 2004

Ednor Gardens-Lakeside is a large community in northeast Baltimore, Maryland. It is bounded by 33rd Street to the south, Hillen Road to the east, Ellerslie Avenue to the west, and Argonne Drive, The Alameda, Loch Raven Boulevard, and Roundhill Road to the north. Ednor Gardens was part of a large planned community that was built out from the 1920s through the 1950s by Edward J. Gallagher, one of Baltimore's most prolific homebuilders at the time. It is notable among its neighbors for the quality of the homes and extensive landscaping. Until it was torn down in 2002, Memorial Stadium (home to the Baltimore Colts and Ravens football teams and Orioles baseball team) was located in Ednor Gardens-Lakeside.

== History ==
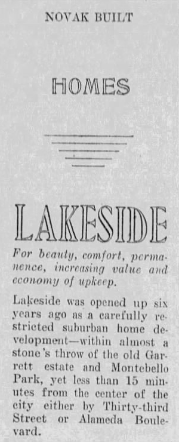
A September 26, 1926 advertisement in the Baltimore Sun for a racially restricted "Novak Built" development in Lakeside, Baltimore.

The entire Ednor Gardens-Lakeside community is located on the former estate of General Samuel Smith, who fought in the Revolutionary War. The property was later transferred to the Garrett family, who owned the B&O Railroad and were one of Baltimore's most powerful families in the 19th century. When Robert Garrett died in 1896, he ceded 1,400 acres of the property to his widow, Mary Garrett. In 1923, Mary Garrett (who had since remarried) sold a 49-acre parcel to Edward Gallagher, a prominent real estate developer, for $146,299. Other transactions occurred until Gallagher controlled much more land. Gallagher named his new development Ednor Gardens, for his two sons, Edward and Norman, by taking the first few letters of their names.

Gallagher set out to build rowhouses unlike anything that had been built in Baltimore to date. He was inspired by the stately English-style mansions in nearby Guilford and Roland Park, but wanted to create a more affordable option. The solution was to incorporate the unique styling into a rowhouse. The first homes rose on East 36th Street in 1925. Unlike many other housing developments at the time, there was no streetcar access to Ednor Gardens, so Gallagher built rear-access garages into every house, correctly predicting the coming of the Automobile Age. The unique houses were popular and sold quickly, leading other prominent developers to copy the English style in new projects around the city.

Development of Ednor Gardens-Lakeside continued through the 1930s, 1940s, and 1950s. Newer rowhouses, which were built north and east of the original Ednor Gardens development, were constructed of brick and lacked the decorative qualities of English-style homes nearby. In the early 1930s, Gallagher was sued by another developer, Frank Novak, who had built some detached single family homes in the Lakeside community next to Lake Montebello. Believing that Gallaghers' rowhouses caused his property to depreciate, Novak won the lawsuit and forced Gallagher to build detached homes on land adjacent to Lakeside.

Prior to the passage of the Fair Housing Act of 1968, racially restrictive covenants were used in Baltimore to exclude African-Americans and other minority groups. A 1926 advertisement in the Baltimore Sun describes Frank Novak's Lakeside development as a "carefully restricted suburban home development".

Despite changes in surrounding communities during the latter half of the 20th century, Ednor Gardens-Lakeside remained relatively stable.

== Memorial Stadium Redevelopment ==
The first stadium at the site was built in 1922 on Venable Park and was called Baltimore Stadium or Venable Stadium. It hosted a variety of smaller events, most notably college football games. It became the home to the Baltimore Orioles in 1944 when the team's previous stadium in Abell burned down. In 1950, the stadium was expanded to become Memorial Stadium. At its largest, Memorial Stadium seated 65,000 fans. The Orioles played their last game at the stadium in 1991 before departing for the newly constructed Oriole Park at Camden Yards in downtown Baltimore. The Baltimore Stallions and Baltimore Ravens football teams played at Memorial Stadium between 1994 and 1997. Memorial Stadium was demolished in 2002.

The demolition of the stadium and its parking lots left a giant 32-acre hole in the center of the Ednor Gardens-Lakeside community. The City awarded a nonprofit developer, Govans Ecumenical Development Corporation (GEDCO) the responsibility of creating and executing a new master plan for the site. The development, christened Stadium Place has an oval-shaped road around the center of the parcel, with a multipurpose athletic field for baseball, football and lacrosse in the middle. The field was developed the Cal Ripken Sr. Foundation. As of 2013, Maryland's largest YMCA sits on the southwest corner of the site, and GEDCO has built four large senior apartment buildings on the eastern edge of the site. Future plans call for more senior apartment buildings and a small commercial center on the southeast corner.

== Demographics ==
As of the 2010 Census, there are 5,185 people living in Ednor Gardens-Lakeside

The community association is named the Ednor Gardens-Lakeside Community Association. The homes range from large single family homes to semi-detached and townhouses in a number of different styles. A majority of homes are owner-occupied.

== Demographics ==
According to the 2000 US Census, 5,070 people live in Ednor Gardens-Lakeside with 81.3% African-American and 16% White. The median family income is $54,358 and 94% of the houses are occupied and 84.5% of those are occupied by the home's owner.

== Government Representation ==
Community	State District	Congressional District	City Council District
Ednor Gardens	43rd	7th	14th
Representatives	Anderson, Washington, McIntosh	Mfume	Clarke

== See also ==
List of Baltimore neighborhoods
