= 127th United States Colored Infantry Regiment =

127th United States Colored Infantry
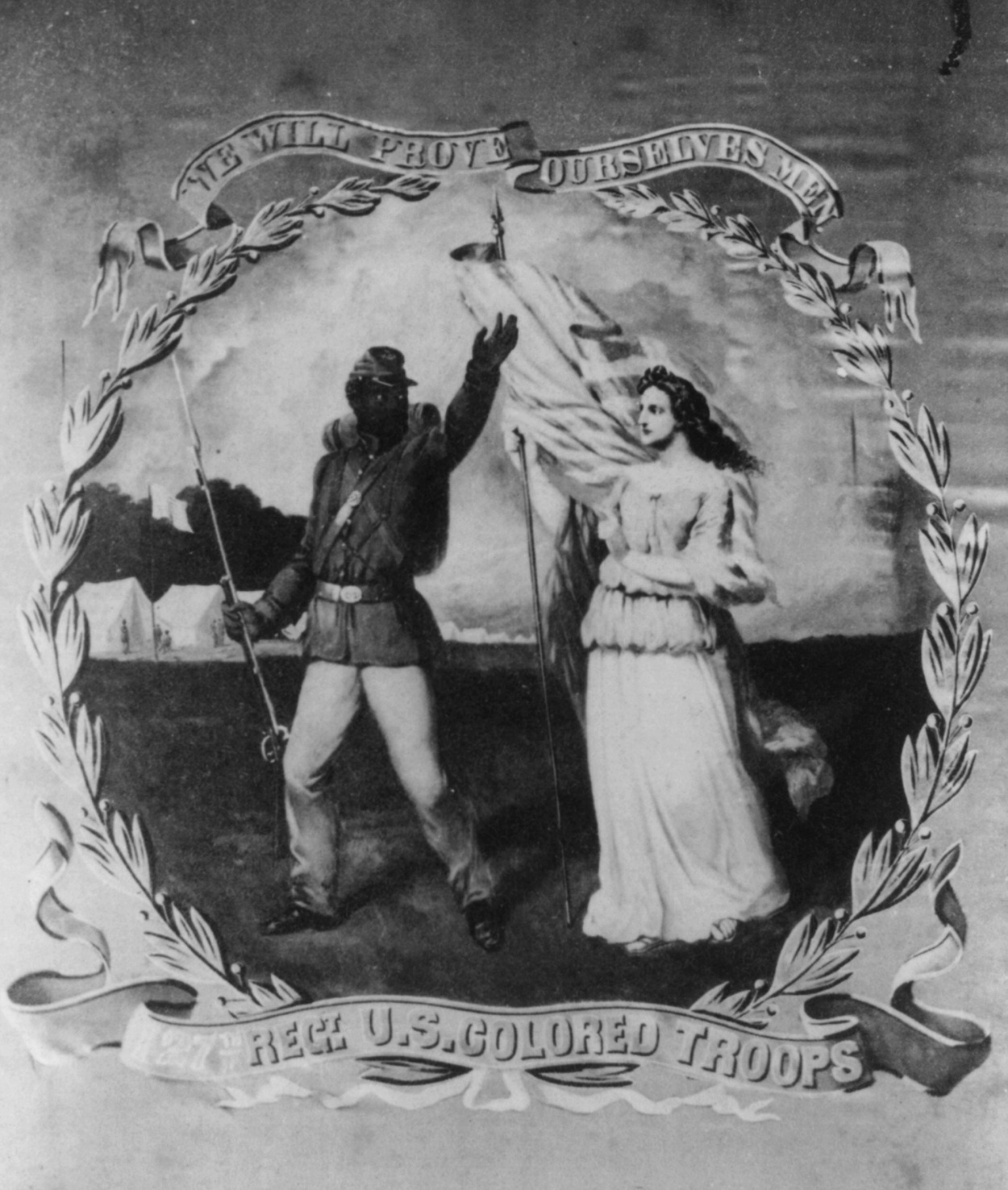
- Battle flag, 127th U.S. Colored Infantry, 1864
- Active: August 23, 1864 – October 20, 1865
- Country: United States
- Allegiance: Union
- Branch: Infantry
- Engagements: American Civil War: Siege of Petersburg: Battle of Chaffin's Farm; Battle of Fair Oaks & Darbytown Road; Appomattox Campaign: Appomattox Court House; Reconstruction Era service: 2nd Brigade, 2nd Division, U.S. 25th Army Corps (Department of Texas)

The 127th United States Colored Infantry was an American infantry regiment which fought with the Union Army during the American Civil War. Staffed by African American enlisted men who were placed under the command of white officers, the regiment was formed and trained at Camp William Penn near Philadelphia, Pennsylvania between August 23 and September 10, 1864.

Following training, the regiment joined the 10th Corps, within the Army of the James, and later took part in some of the final battles of the war including the Battle of Chaffin's Farm, the Battle of Fair Oaks and Darbytown Road and the fighting around the Appomattox Court House. After the war, the regiment undertook occupation duties as part of the 25th Corps in Texas along the Mexican frontier and the Rio Grande River before its personnel were mustered out in September and October 1865.

This regiment's battle flag was one of eleven designed by African American ornamental artist and portraitist David Bustill Bowser.

== History ==
The 127th U.S. Colored Infantry was formed on August 23, 1864, at Camp William Penn, near Philadelphia, Pennsylvania. The regiment's enlisted personnel were African Americans, under the command of white officers. Its first central command staff included: Colonel Benjamin F. Tracy, Lieutenant Colonel James Given, Major Arthur M. Greene, Quartermaster John W. Taylor, Surgeon William C. Powell, Assistant Surgeon Eugene A. Chapman, and Chaplain Thomas S. Johnson.

After completing training on September 10, the regiment was ordered to City Point, Virginia. The regiment was attached to the 1st Brigade, 3rd Division of the U.S. Army's 10th Corps (Army of the James) until November 1864 when it was transferred to the 10th Corps' 2nd Brigade, 3rd Division. According to historian Samuel P. Bates, during this period of service, this regiment sustained only a single casualty, and that occurred during Union Army actions associated with the Second Battle of Deep Bottom, Virginia and the Siege of Petersburg. Other historians have noted, however, that these actions occurred later in the siege, and were related to the Battle of Chaffin's Farm (September 29–30), Battle of Fair Oaks and Darbytown Road (October 13 and October 27–28), trench duties outside of Richmond (until March 1865), operations near Hatcher's Run (March 29–31), and the Appomattox Campaign and Confederate States Army's surrender by Robert E. Lee (April 1865).

According to U.S. National Park Service historians, the 127th U.S. Colored Infantry was one of the Union regiments which "made the journey all the way to Appomattox Court House with Major General Edward Ord's Union Army of the James and arrived in time to be involved in the final fighting.... On the morning of the 9th at Appomattox Court House, the black units were sent forward to support other Federal units in the closing phase of the battle...."

Afterward, the 127th was assigned to post-war duties at City Point. In June 1865, the regiment was shipped south to Brazos Santiago, Texas, where it was attached to the 2nd Brigade, 2nd Division, of the U.S. Army's 25th Corps (Department of Texas), and was assigned to duties along the Mexican frontier and Rio Grande River.

Following the honorable discharge of a significant number of the 127th's members and the members of other Union infantry units, the remaining infantrymen from the 127th were merged with other Union troops into a three-company-strength battalion on September 11, 1865. On October 20, of that same year, these men were also then honorably mustered out.

== Battle flag, uniforms and other equipment ==
The regiment's battle flag (shown above) was one of 11 designed by African American ornamental artist and portraitist David Bustill Bowser, and was "one of the first widely viewed, positive images of African Americans painted by an African American," according to historians at the Pennsylvania Historical and Museum Commission.

== See also ==
- List of Pennsylvania Civil War Units
- 3rd United States Colored Infantry Regiment
- 22nd United States Colored Infantry Regiment
- 25th United States Colored Infantry Regiment
- 45th United States Colored Infantry Regiment
