= Henry Harmon =

African-American politician

Henry S. Harmon (c. 1839 – December 24, 1889) was an attorney and politician in Florida after the Civil War. He was the first African-American to be admitted to the bar in Florida. He was from Pennsylvania and served in the Union army during the Civil War. He was a Republican.

== Early life ==
Henry Harmon was born in Philadelphia, Pennsylvania in 1839. His parents, Timothy and Robinet Harmon, had been slaves in Virginia, but had escaped to the North before Henry was born. Although details of his young years are scarce, Henry was later described as "a [man] of education."

Harmon enlisted in the 3rd United States Colored Infantry Regiment when it was formed in August 1863, and was promoted to the rank of sergeant before the end of the year. He served with the Third USCI at the sieges of Fort Wagner and Fort Gregg on Morris Island. Harmon became friends with future congressman Josiah T. Walls while serving in the Third. At the end of the Civil War, a portion of the Third Regiment, including Harmon, was stationed in Gainesville, Florida. Harmon was discharged from the Army in Gainesville in late 1865.

In letters to the Philadelphia Christian Recorder (a publication of the African Methodist Episcopal Church), Harmon expressed his dissatisfaction over the position of African-Americans in the South. In the first two years after the end of the Civil War control of southern states was returned to men who had supported the Confederacy, who instituted black codes that restricted the rights of African-Americans. Resistance by African-Americans to the black codes was met with violence by whites, and in 1866 Alachua County, of which Gainesville was the county seat, was placed under martial law.

== Political office ==
Starting in March 1867, the Military Reconstruction Acts restored federal military control to the former Confederate states. Former Confederate officials and supporters were temporarily barred from voting and holding office and African-Americans were guaranteed the right to vote. Harmon was soon appointed as a voting registrar in Alachua County. In March 1868 Harmon served as a vice president of the Alachua County Republican Party Convention. He and Josiah Walls were nominated for, and won, seats in the Florida House of Representatives, serving until 1870.

Harmon concentrated on improvements to the administration of government and generally avoided controversial proposals on social issues, for which he was criticized by more radical elements of the Republican Party. Harmon is credited with helping to pass legislation establishing free public education in Florida. Harmon was elected to the Gainesville town commission in 1869. In 1970, while campaigning for another term in the Florida House of Representative, Harmon and Josiah Walls, who was running for the Florida seat in the United States Congress, were denied a cabin on the steamboat Oklawaha, and had to sleep on the deck. Harrison Reed, Republican governor of Florida, joined the two on deck.

The governor of Florida appointed Harmon clerk of the court for Alachua County in 1871. This position included keeping records for the county commission and the courts in the county, overseeing county government operations, and witnessing and recording deeds and mortgages. Harmon, as clerk of the court, together with the county judge and a justice of the peace, all Republicans, served on the board of canvassers for Alachua County in the election of 1872. The board of canvassers threw out the results from two precincts because the returns, which favored the Republicans, had been forged. Republican party officials pressured the board to count the fraudulent votes. The county judge, William Birney, was arrested on the order of Republican party leaders, and Harmon and the other canvasser were threatened by the "Liberty Hill Gang", a radical faction of the Republican Party in Florida. Harmon ran for the Florida Senate in 1872, but the Republican Party was split and Harmon lost to the incumbent Democrat. Harmon remained well regarded in the Republican Party, and he was appointed chief clerk of the Florida House of Representatives in 1873. He was re-elected to that post in 1874 and 1875. He was also appointed to a customs post in Tampa in 1873, but he was resented as an outsider, and apparently did not serve long in the post.

The Compromise of 1877 ended Reconstruction in Florida, and Democrats gained control of state government. Despite the loss of opportunity for African-Americans in politics and in appointed positions in state government, Harmon remained active in the Republican Party. He was a delegate to the 1876 Republican National Convention. He was secretary to the State Republican Executive Committee in 1880 and an officer of the 1880 Florida Republican state convention. He was appointed the deputy United States collector of revenue for Florida in June of that year. Political patronage positions in the Federal government for African-Americans in the South ended when Grover Cleveland became President in 1885. Harmon did not hold any elected or appointed office after that.

== Legal career ==
In May 1869 Harmon applied to the circuit court to be admitted to the bar. The court appointed two members of the Alachua County bar to examine Harmon, and they reported to the court that he was competent to practice law in Florida. Harmon was the first African-American admitted to the bar in Florida. In June 1874 Harmon formed a law partnership in Gainesville with Josiah Walls, who had been admitted to the bar after Harmon had, and William U. Saunders, who had been sent to Florida from Maryland after the Civil War by the Republican National Committee to help organize the party in Florida. The next year Harmon and Saunders opened a law office in Tallahassee specializing in government land claims. Although the end of Reconstruction in 1877 had ended Harmon's chances for election to public office, he could still practice law in Tallahassee. African-Americans were still serving on juries, and the United States court system was still in Republican hands. Harmon's appointment as deputy collector of revenue in 1880 resulted in him withdrawing from the practice of law.

== Arrest for fraud ==
Harmon was arrested in March 1874 and charged with fraud and forgery. It was alleged that, while serving as clerk of the court for Alachua County, Harmon had altered the amounts on county scrip that he redeemed and subsequently presented to the county commission for reimbursement. Harmon was released on bail, but the case did not go to trial until April 1876, when Harmon was found not guilty. Harmon avoided political office while the charge was pending, declining an attempt to nominate him for mayor of Gainesville.

== Other activities ==
In 1867, Harmon was a founding member of the Board of Trustees for Union Academy in Gainesville, the first school for African-Americans in Gainesville and Alachua County.

In 1875, Harmon was one of several African-American leaders who requested that part of the money allocated to the West Florida Seminary be re-allocated to support schools serving African-Americans. In 1876, Harmon served as the head of a committee on education at an assembly of "colored men" of Florida held in Tallahassee. The committee issued a report calling for the establishment of an agricultural college serving African-Americans. That year, the school board in Leon County appointed Harmon as principal of the recently rebuilt Lincoln Academy in Tallahassee. He lost that position the next year with the return to power of the Democrats.

Around 1880 Harmon became involved in the newspaper business. He was reported to be the publisher of three newspapers in east central Florida, the Volusia County News in Orange City, and the Florida Star and Indian River Times in Titusville. With the loss of Federal patronage positions in Florida after 1885, and facing difficulties resuming a legal career with local and state courts increasing hostile to African-Americans, Harmon opened a successful cabinetmaking and upholstery business in Tallahassee.

== Family life ==
Harmon married local resident Sophia Ligon in Gainesville in November 1865, shortly after being discharged from the army. When he moved to Tallahassee in 1876 Sophia remained in Gainesville. Harmon transferred his property in Alachua County to Sophia in 1877. It is not clear how Harmon's marriage to Sophia ended, but by the early 1880s he had married again. In 1883, Henry and Nancy Harmon adopted Lydia DeCoursey, who may have been the daughter of Phillip DeCoursey. Decoursey had been sheriff of Leon County for nine months before his death from pneumonia in 1875. In 1885, the Florida state census listed Harmon as "widowed". Harmon died in Tallahassee on December 24, 1889.

== See also ==
- African American officeholders from the end of the Civil War until before 1900

== Sources ==
- Davis, William Watson (1913). The Civil War and Reconstruction in Florida. New York: Columbia University. ISBN 9780722283370.
- Ensley, Gerald (September 12, 2014). "Leon County had two black sheriffs in Reconstruction". Tallahassee Democrat. Archived from the original on September 24, 2021.
- Laurie, Murray D. (October 1986). "The Union Academy: a Freedman's Bureau School in Gainesville, Florida". The Florida Historical Quarterly. 65 (2): 163–174. JSTOR 30146739.
- Pastore, Stephanie (August 1, 2014). "Taking a stand on the decks of the Ocklawaha". The Gainesville Sun. Archived from the original on January 29, 2021.
- Rivers, Larry Eugene; Brown, Canter Jr. (Summer 2006). ""A Monument to the Progress of the Race": the Intellectual and Political Origins of the Florida Agricultural and Mechanical University, 1865–1887". The Florida Historical Quarterly. 85 (1): 1–41. JSTOR 30150046.
- Shafer, Gerald H. (April 1963). "The Constitution of 1868". The Florida Historical Quarterly. 41 (4): 358. JSTOR 30139965.
- Young, Darius J. (Fall 2006). "Henry S. Harmon: Pioneer African-American Attorney in Reconstruction-era Florida". The Florida Historical Quarterly. 85 (2): 177–196. JSTOR 30150703.
