= Elizabeth Harriet Stevens Gray Bowser =

Elizabeth Harriet Stevens Gray Bowser (June 13, 1831 – November 29, 1908) was an American artisan, businesswoman, and philanthropist. She was active in the mid-19th century flourishing of Voluntary associations in Philadelphia, as a supplier of decorative goods for organization members and as a contributor to charitable organizations.

== Career ==
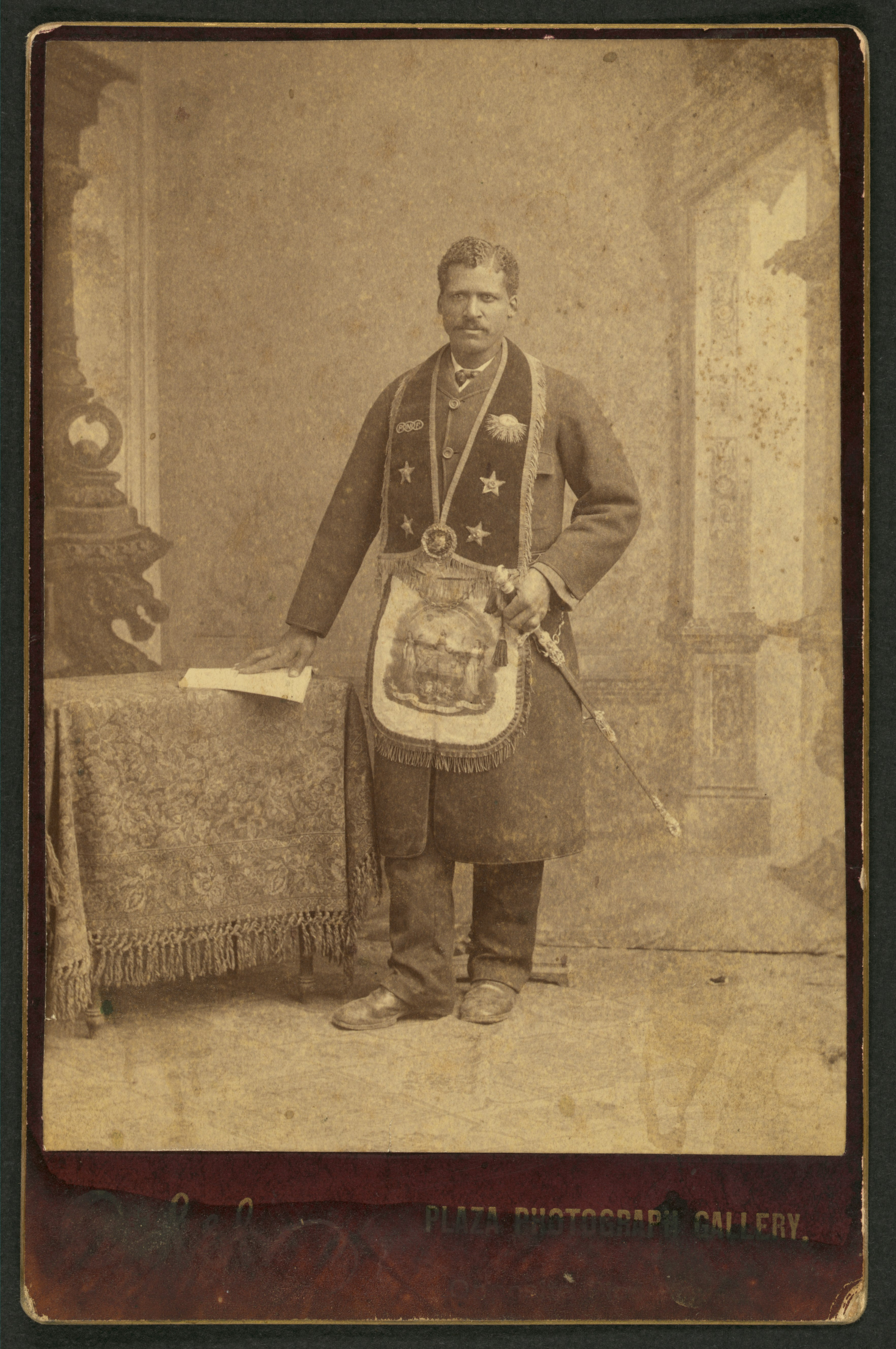
A member of the Grand United Order of Odd Fellows wearing a fraternal order collar similar to those Bowser crafted.

Lizzie Bowser lived in Philadelphia's Twelfth Ward with her husband David Bustill Bowser, with whom she ran a successful business. The couple manufactured memorabilia, regalia, and decorative objects for the many voluntary associations in the area. Their clients included African-American fraternal organizations like the Grand United Order of Odd Fellows, volunteer fire brigades, and American Civil War relief organizations. Lizzie used her skills as a seamstress to craft elaborate ceremonial collars, and David created decorative paintings on hats, banners, and other objects bearing insignia. On one collar in the collection of the National Museum of American History, the maker's mark reads "Mrs. D.B. Bowser Odd Fellows and Masonic Depot."

The couple held a prominent position in Philadelphia's African-American society, and were known for their philanthropic contributions to charitable organizations. Their giving served an activist purpose; many of the groups they supported were meant to advance the social position of African-Americans, and compensate for the frequent exclusion of Black communities from public disaster relief.

Bowser was a member of the Household of Ruth, the women's branch of the Grand United Order of Odd Fellows in America. She was also an active member of the Ladies' Union Association of Philadelphia, a charitable organization founded during the Civil War by free Black women. The Ladies' Union Association raised money to provide relief for formerly enslaved people and support for Black soldiers returning from war. Through her work with these organizations, Bowser became friends with diarist Emilie Frances Davis, with whom she socialized and attended Bible study classes.

Bowser would often arrange sales of her husband's artworks to benefit the fundraising efforts of relief organizations. In May 1865, she raised $1200 in sales to benefit the Ladies' Union Association.

== Personal life ==
Bowser and her husband had three children: Mary, Raphael, and Ida. Raphael Bowser followed his father's path and became a painter; Ida Elizabeth Bowser Asbury became a violinist and music teacher, and was the first African American woman to earn a degree from the University of Pennsylvania
