= 45th United States Colored Infantry Regiment =

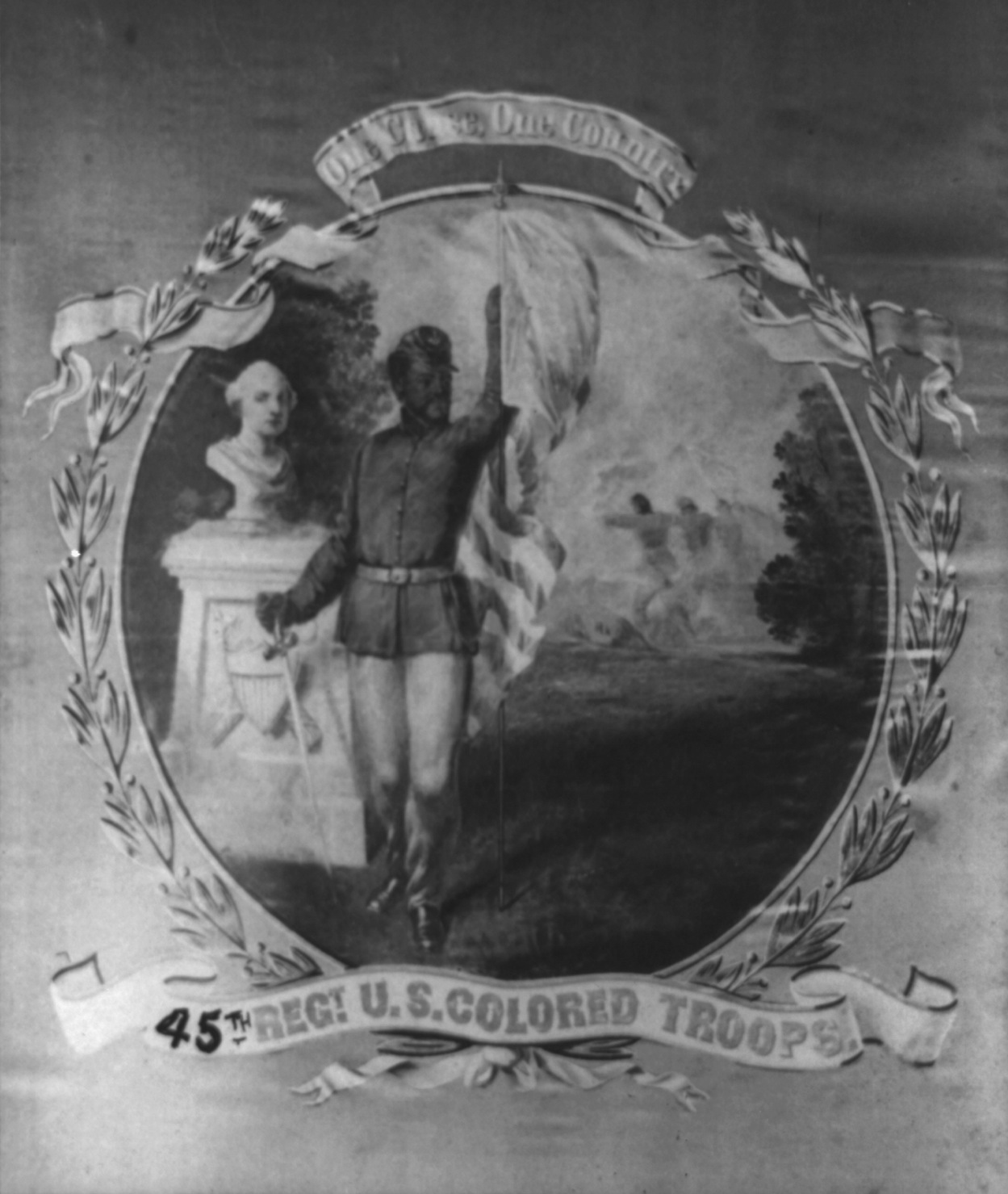
- Battle flag, 45th U.S. Colored Infantry, 1863
- Active: July 1864 - December 13, 1865
- Country: United States
- Allegiance: Union
- Branch: Infantry
- Engagements: American Civil War

The 45th United States Colored Infantry was an infantry regiment of the Union Army during the American Civil War.

== Formation ==
The regiment was formed in 1864, and was composed of men who had been born as free men and others who had been formerly enslaved, but had been freed prior to their enlistment with the Union Army and the USCT. The primary states of residence of the men who fought with this regiment were New Jersey, Pennsylvania, Virginia, and West Virginia.

The regiment's flag was designed by David Bustill Bowser and shows an image depicting an African American soldier, representing the 45th United States Colored Troops, standing next to a bust statue of George Washington.

== Officers ==
Ulysses Doubleday, Colonel; Edward Thorn, Lieutenant Colonel; James T. Bates, Major; Lindley Coates Kent, First Lieutenant, then captain, and acting adjutant of the 45th., Edelmiro Mayer.

== Service Record ==
Formed at Camp William Penn, Pennsylvania, in the summer of 1864. "45th Regiment, United States Colored Infantry. Organized at Philadelphia, Pa., June 13 to August 19, 1864. Moved to Washington, D. C. (4 Cos.), July, 1864. Attached to Provisional Brigade, Casey's Division, 22nd Corps, and garrison duty at Arlington Heights, Va., till March, 1865. Rejoined Regiment at Chaffin's Farm, Va., March 14, 1865. Six Companies moved to City Point, Va., September 20, 1864. Attached to 2nd Brigade, 3rd Division, 10th Corps, Army of the James, to December, 1864. 2nd Brigade, 2nd Division, 25th Corps, and Dept. of Texas, to November, 1865.

SERVICE: Demonstration on north side of the James River and battle of Chaffin's Farm, New Market Heights, September 28–30, 1864. Fort Harrison September 29. Darbytown Road October 13. Battle of Fair Oaks October 27–28. In trenches before Richmond till March, 1865. Moved to Hatcher's Run March 27–28. Appomattox Campaign March 28-April 9. Hatcher's Run March 29–31. Fall of Petersburg April 2. Pursuit of Lee April 3–9. Appomattox Court House April 9. Surrender of Lee and his army. Duty at Petersburg and City Point till May. Moved to Texas May and June. Duty at Edinburg on Mexican Frontier till September 8, and at Brownsville, Texas, till November. Mustered out November 4, 1865."

The difficulties of the regiment during the Red River Campaign were described by Private Pleasant Richardson's descendants: "He served with the 45th Infantry of the U.S. Colored Troops, a posting that took him to West Virginia and Pennsylvania, then Washington, D.C., and in the spring of 1864, he was one of 30,000 Union soldiers who undertook the ill-fated Red River Campaign across Louisiana. Roughly one in five men on the Union side died during that expedition, but Richardson survived and the following year he was present when Gen. Robert E. Lee surrendered at Appomattox Court House, according to a 1935 article in the Fincastle Herald."

== See also ==
- List of United States Colored Troops Civil War Units

== Bibliography ==
- Allen, LaVonne Patterson. Military Records of United States Colored Troops Born in New Kent County, Virginia. Lanexa, VA: LaVonne Patterson Allen & Camilla Lewis Tramuel, 2011.
- Doubleday, Ulysses. Ulysses Doubleday order-book. n.d. Summary: Order-book (248 pages) concerning Doubleday's service as a major in the 4th N.Y. Artillery, as lieutenant colonel of the 3rd U.S. Colored Troops, and as colonel commanding a brigade of the 45th U.S. Colored Troops at the Battle of Five Forks. Consists of correspondence, inspection records, rosters of officers, military lessons, newspaper clippings, and material pertaining to armaments and arrangement of artillery of Forts Ethan Allen and Marcy in Virginia and to other military matters. Also includes biographical sketch of Doubleday's brother, Abner.
- Military Order of the Loyal Legion of the United States, Thomas Skelton Harrison, and John P. Nicholson. In Memoriam Lindley Coates Kent Major 109th U.S. Colored Troops: Died at Wilmington, Del. February 12, 1916. [Philadelphia, Pennsylvania]: [Military Order of the Loyal Legion of the United States. Headquarters Commandery of the State of Pennsylvania], 1916.
- United States, Josiah F. Marsh, and Alexander Wilkin. Regimental Order Book. Washington, D.C.: National Archives, 1985.
- New Jersey. United States Colored Troops Volunteer Certificates. 1864. Summary: Fifty-one volunteer certificates recording the recruitment of New Jersey men into the United States Colored Troops, chiefly assigned to the 43rd and 45th regiments. Certificates include name, age, height, date, and congressional district/municipality credited for each soldier.
