= 3rd United States Colored Infantry Regiment =

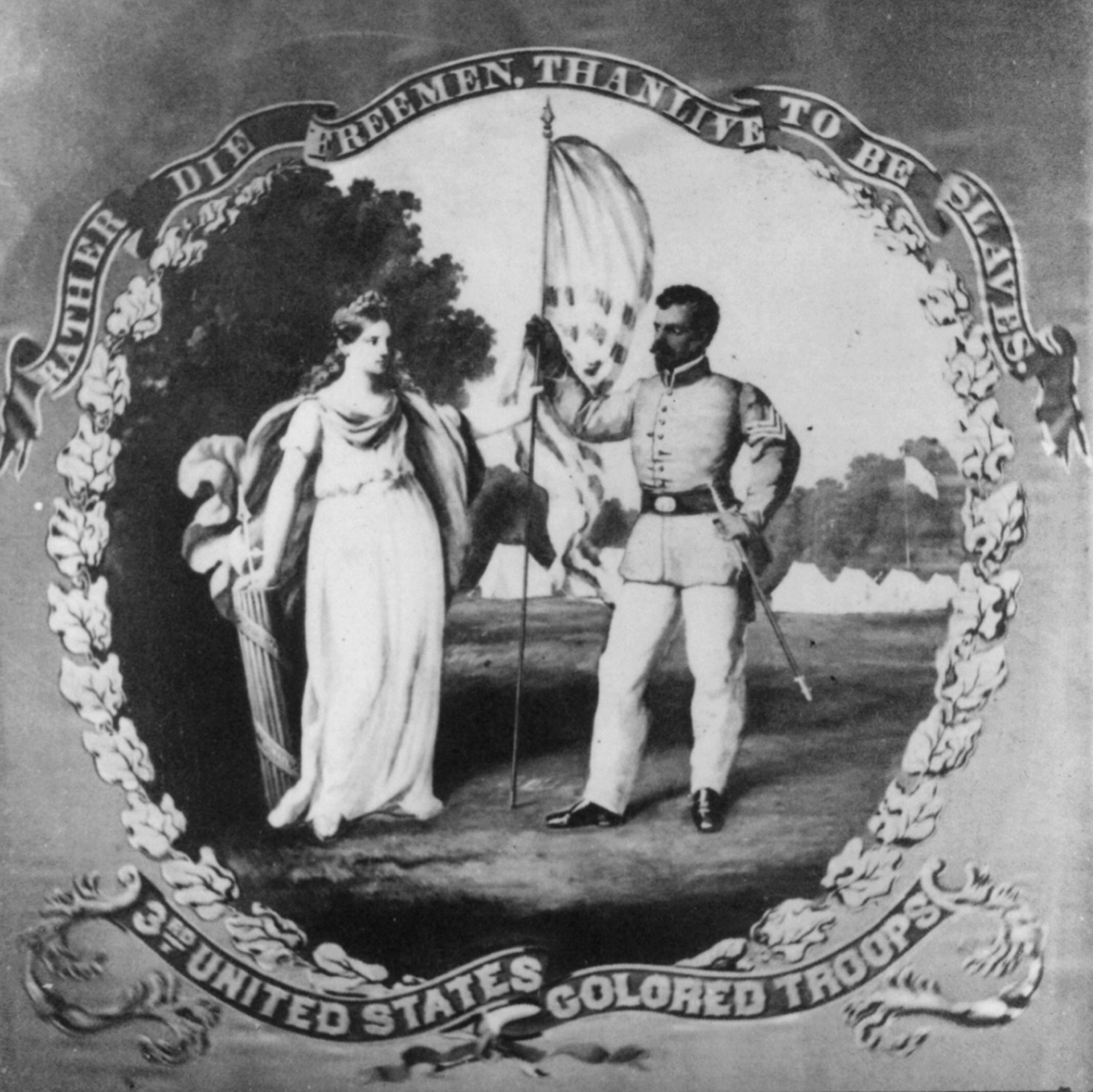
- Battle flag, 3rd U.S. Colored Infantry, c. 1863
- Active: August 10, 1863 – October 31, 1865
- Country: United States
- Allegiance: Union

The 3rd United States Colored Infantry Regiment was an infantry regiment that served in the Union Army during the American Civil War. The regiment was composed of African American enlisted men commanded by white officers and was authorized by the Bureau of Colored Troops which was created by the United States War Department on May 22, 1863. Josiah T. Walls served in it as did Henry Harmon.

The regiment's battle flag was designed by African-American ornamental artist and portraitist David Bustill Bowser, and was "one of the first widely viewed, positive images of African Americans painted by an African American," according to historians at the Pennsylvania Historical and Museum Commission.

== Service ==
The 3rd United States Colored Infantry Regiment was organized at Philadelphia, Pennsylvania beginning August 3, 1863 and mustered on August 10, 1863. Its colonel was Benjamin Chew Tilghman.

August 3–10, 1863. Ordered to Dept. of the South. Attached to 4th Brigade, Morris Island, S. C., 10th Corps, Dept. of the South, to November, 1863. 3rd Brigade, Morris Island, S. C., 10th Corps, to January, 1864. Montgomery's Brigade, District of Hilton Head, S. C., 10th Corps, to February, 1864. 2nd Brigade, Vodges' Division, District of Florida, Dept. of the South, to April, 1864. District of Florida, Dept. of the South, to October, 1864. 4th Separate Brigade, District of Florida, Dept. of the South, to July, 1865. Dept. of Florida to October, 1865.

The 3rd U.S. Colored Infantry mustered out of service October 31, 1865.

== Detailed service ==
Siege of Forts Wagner and Gregg, Morris Island, S. C., August 20 – September 7, 1863. Action at Forts Wagner and Gregg August 26. Capture of Forts Wagner and Gregg September 7. Operations against Charleston from Morris Island till January, 1864. Moved to Hilton Head, S. C., thence to Jacksonville, Fla., February 5–7, and duty there as Heavy Artillery till May, 1865. (1 Co. at Fernandina, Fla.) Expedition from Jacksonville to Camp Milton May 31 – June 3, 1864. Front Creek July 15. Bryan's Plantation October 21. Duty at Tallahassee, Lake City and other points in Florida May to October, 1865. Mustered out October 31, 1865.

== See also ==
- List of United States Colored Troops Civil War Units
- United States Colored Troops
