= 25th United States Colored Infantry Regiment =

Union Army infantry regiment

25th United States Colored Infantry
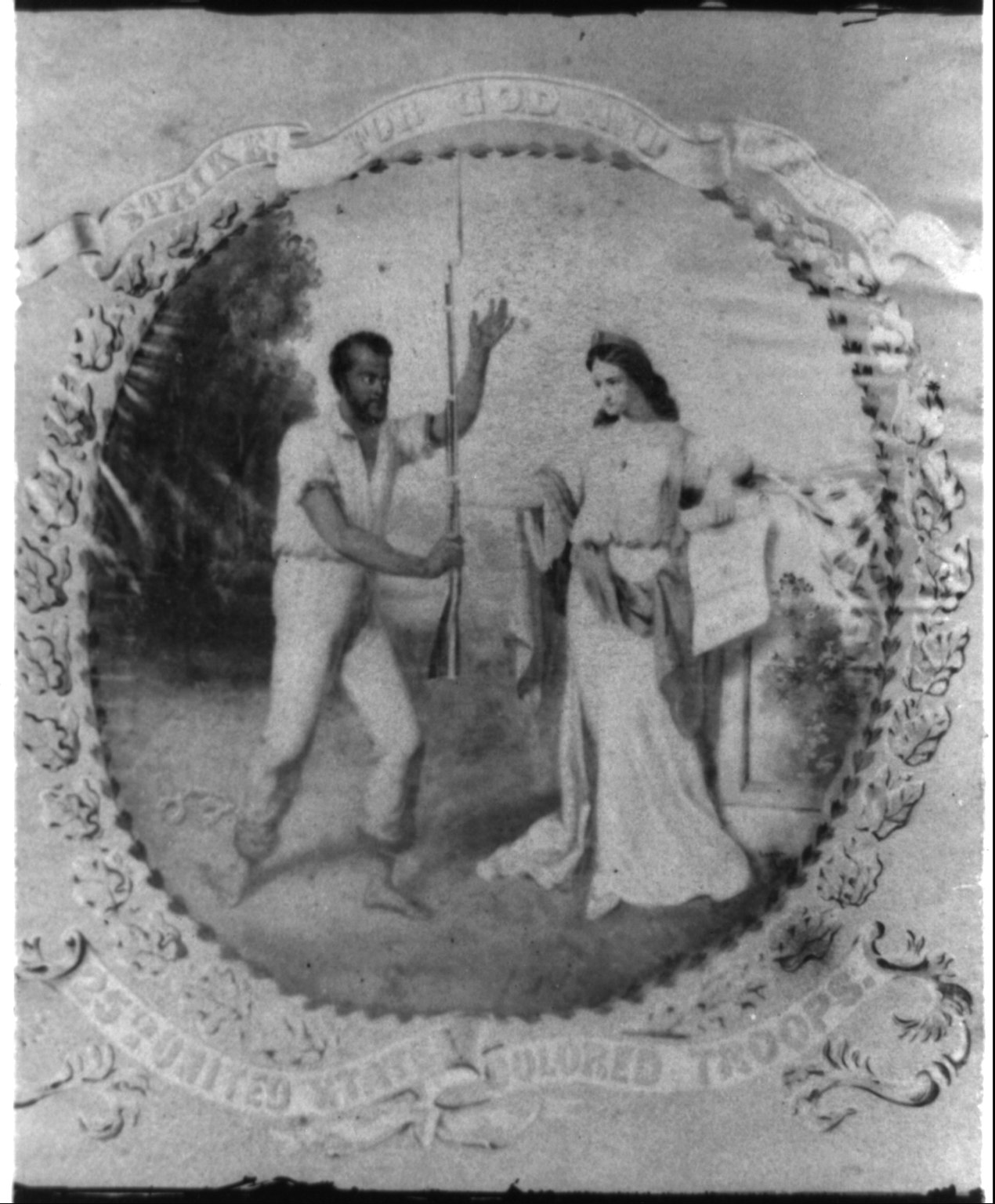
- Battle flag, 25th U.S. Colored Infantry, 1864
- Active: January 3, 1864 – December 6, 1865
- Country: United States
- Allegiance: Union
- Branch: Infantry

The 25th United States Colored Infantry was an infantry regiment that served in the Union Army during the American Civil War. The regiment was composed of African American enlisted men commanded by white officers and was authorized by the Bureau of Colored Troops which was created by the United States War Department on May 22, 1863.

== Service ==
The 25th U.S. Colored Infantry was organized at Camp William Penn near Philadelphia, Pennsylvania beginning January 3, 1864 for three-year service under the command of Colonel Gustavus A. Scroggs.

The regiment was attached to Defenses of New Orleans, Louisiana, Department of the Gulf, May to July 1864. District of Pensacola, Florida, Department of the Gulf, to October 1864. 1st Brigade, 3rd Division, U.S. Colored Troops, Department of the Gulf, October 1864. 1st Brigade, District of West Florida, to January 1865. 3rd Brigade, 1st Division, U.S. Colored Troops, District of West Florida, to February 1865. 1st Brigade, 1st Division, U.S. Colored Troops, District of West Florida, to April 1865. Unattached, District of West Florida, to July 1865. Department of Florida, to December 1865.

The 25th U.S. Colored Infantry mustered out of service December 6, 1865.

== Detailed service ==
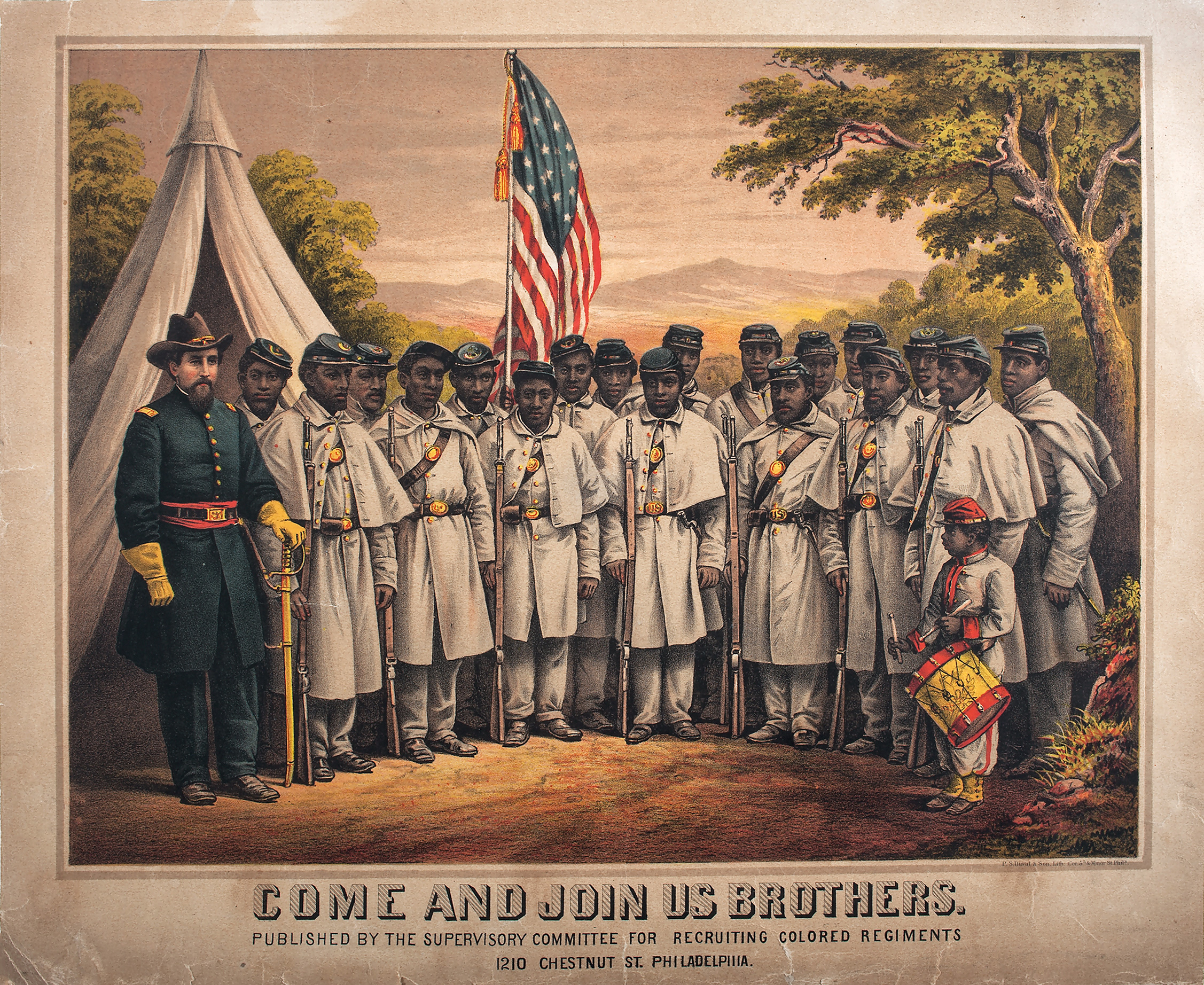
USCT Recruiting poster based upon an 1864 photograph of 25th USCT recruits.

Sailed for New Orleans, La., on the steamer Suwanee March 15, 1864 (right wing). Vessel sprung a leak off Cape Hatteras and put into harbor at Beaufort, North Carolina. Duty there in the defenses, under Gen. Wessells, until April, then proceeded to New Orleans, arriving May 1. Left Wing in camp at Carrollton. Duty in the Defenses of New Orleans, La., until July 1864. Garrison duty at Post of Barrancas, Fla. (6 companies), and at Fort Pickens, Pensacola Harbor (4 companies), until December 1865.

== Commanders ==
- Colonel Gustavus A. Scroggs
- Colonel Frederick L. Hitchcock

== See also ==
- List of United States Colored Troops Civil War Units
- United States Colored Troops

== Works cited ==
- Dyer, Frederick H. A Compendium of the War of the Rebellion (Des Moines, IA: Dyer Pub. Co.), 1908.

Attribution
