= Camp William Penn =

American Civil War training camp

- Cheltenham Township, Montgomery County, Pennsylvania, U.S.

Site information
- Type: training camp
- Operator: Union Army

Site history
- Built: 1863
- In use: 1863 - 1865

Camp William Penn
- Location within Philadelphia
- 40.06635°N 75.1423°W
- Location: 7322 Sycamore Ave., La Mott, Pennsylvania
- Nearest city: Philadelphia

History
- Built: 1863

Site notes
- Governing body: Township of Cheltenham

Camp William Penn was a Union Army training camp located in Cheltenham Township, Pennsylvania from 1863 to 1865 during the American Civil War. The camp was notable for being the first training ground dedicated to African American troops who enlisted in the Union Army during the Civil War. Some 11,000 free black men and escaped slaves were trained here, including 8,612 from Pennsylvania, the most black troops recruited during the war from any northern state. It was the largest training camp for African American soldiers.

== History ==
After Abraham Lincoln issued the Emancipation Proclamation, many freed blacks stepped forward to fight in the army. Thousands of ex-slaves and free blacks displayed a desire to prove they were citizens, like the soldiers currently fighting the war. Often blacks who enlisted were treated rudely and were turned away. Camp William Penn became the "training camp for colored troops enlisted into the United States Army."

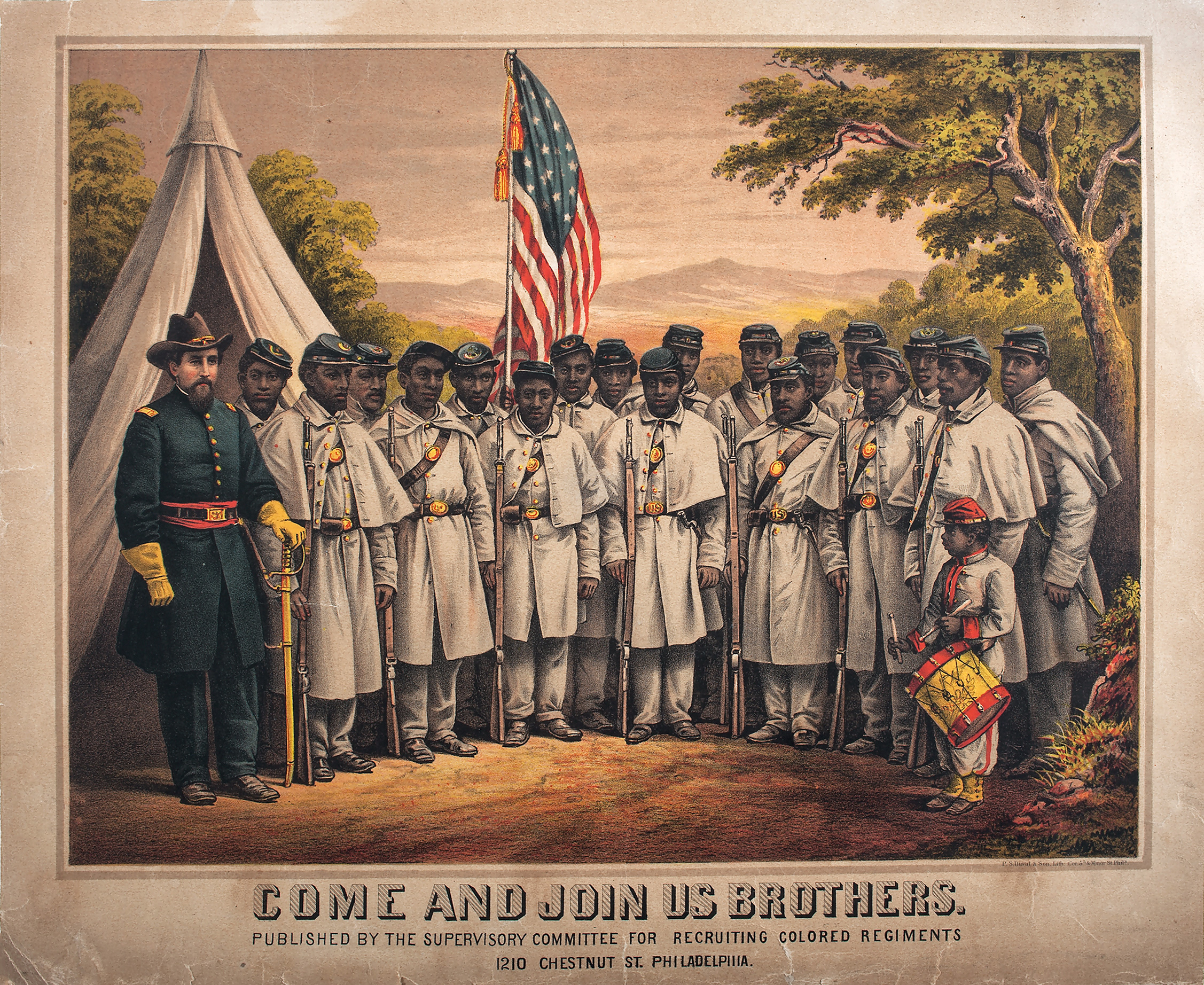
USCT recruiting poster Philadelphia based upon 1864 photograph of 25th USCT recruits-see

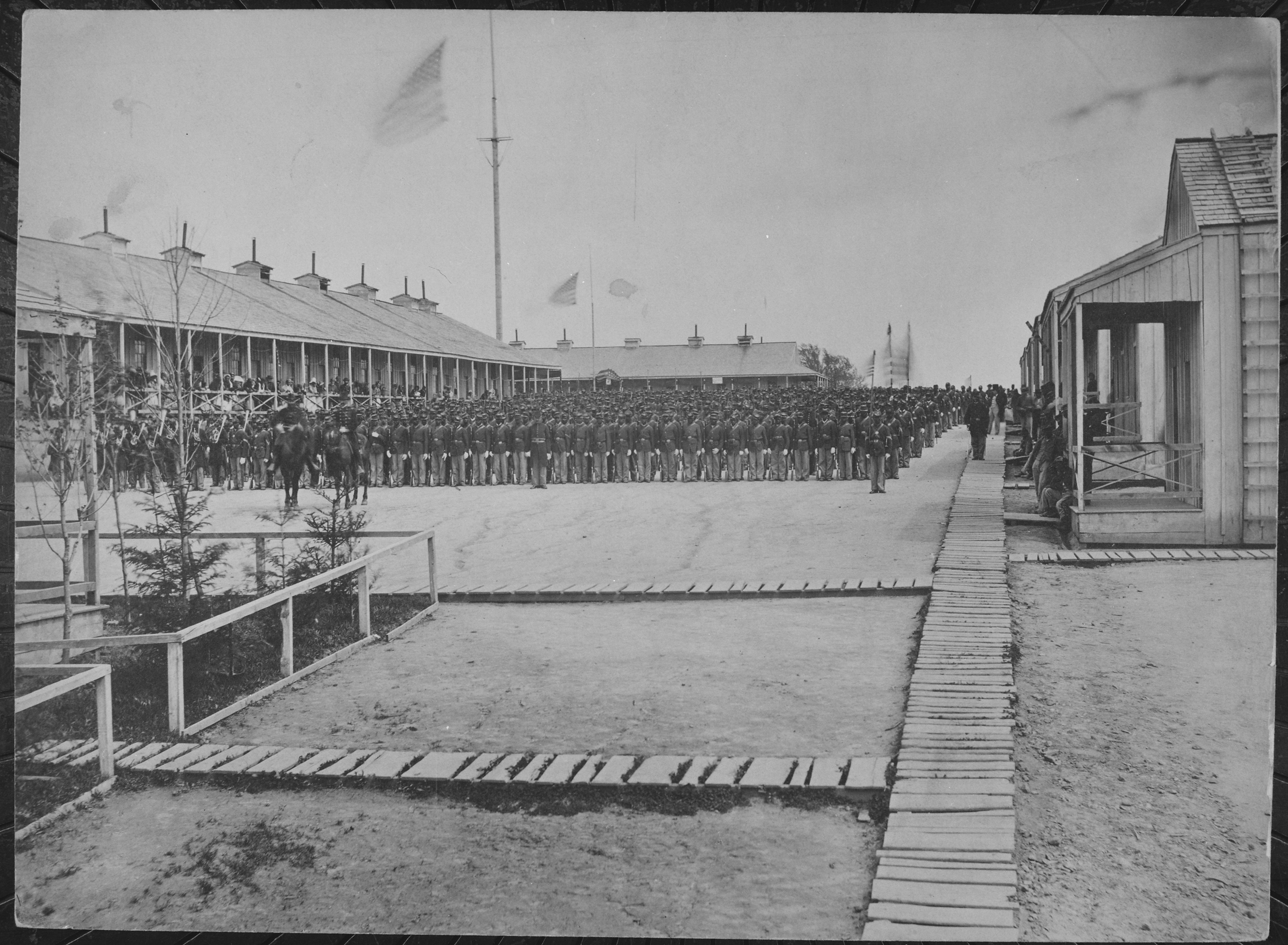
26th United States Colored Volunteer Infantry at Camp William Penn, 1865. From the collection of the National Archives and Records Administration.

The family of Lucretia Mott, an abolitionist and women's rights advocate, leased land they owned to the Federal government so that a training camp could be established there. This parcel was located in Chelten Hills in Cheltenham Township, Pennsylvania, just outside the city limits of Philadelphia. Originally, the camp was to be named after Lincoln's Secretary of War, Edwin M. Stanton, but, when final plans were approved, the camp was named William Penn.

All of the troops at Camp William Penn were black volunteers who came from a number of states. Lt.Col. Louis Wagner, who was recovering from wounds received at the Battle of Chancellorsville, volunteered to take command of the camp in early 1863. The camp was the largest federal training facility for African-American soldiers. The camp, which was fully operational by July 4, 1863, served as the training ground for eleven regiments, nearly 11,000 men, in its two years of existence.

Local antagonists closely observed the activities at Camp William Penn. Many worried that black recruits might defy government authority. When Frederick Douglass entered the grounds to speak with the black recruits, he observed some disturbing activities. Douglass noted black recruits being punished for various military infractions and was deeply disturbed. Many of these recruits were men who already bore the scars of slavery. Douglass told the troops: "You are a spectacle for men and angels. You are in a manner to answer the question, can the black man be a soldier? That we can now make soldiers of these men there can be no doubt."

Because of continuing racism, the black troops were not treated equally. Many soldiers complained of harsh treatment. Still, Camp William Penn symbolized an advancement of importance for African-Americans. Although the white community seemed to lack tolerance for the soldiers, Colonel Wagner insisted that his black soldiers ignore segregationist policies. Confederate soldiers hated commanders of black regiments and when black troops were taken prisoner, the commanders were often executed with their men.

Famed black artist David Bustill Bowser designed and painted the regimental flag of the 6th United States Colored Infantry Regiment, who trained at the camp. The flag depicted "the Goddess of Liberty holding a flag while exhorting a freedman dressed as a soldier to do his duty." He also designed the flag of the 45th United States Colored Infantry Regiment. The regiment's flag shows an image depicting an African American soldier, representing the 45th United States Colored Troops, standing next to bust statue of George Washington.

== Legacy ==
The Historical Society of Pennsylvania developed a study guide about the camp.

== See also ==
- La Mott Historic District
