= Paul Robeson discography =

The following is the discography of American singer Paul Robeson.

== Studio albums ==
Year	Album	Format
1940	Ballad for Americans	2 × 10" 78 r.p.m., RCA Victor P-20
1941	Chee Lai – Songs of New China	3 × 10" 78 r.p.m., Keynote 109
1943	Songs of Free Men	4 × 10" 78 r.p.m., Columbia Masterworks M 534
1946	Spirituals	4 × 10" 78 r.p.m., Columbia Masterworks M 610
1946	Here Comes the Showboat: Various artists	4 × 12" 78 r.p.m., Columbia Masterworks C 55
1948	A Robeson Recital of Popular Favourites	4 × 10" 78 r.p.m., Columbia Masterworks MM 732
1949	Swing Low, Sweet Chariot	4 × 10" 78 r.p.m., Columbia Masterworks MM 819
1953	Negro Spirituals and Blues: Various artists	12" LP, Concert Hall M-2340
1953	Robeson Sings	3 × 10" 78 r.p.m., Othello Records R-101 / 10" LP (L-101)
1954	Solid Rock – Favorite Hymns of My People	3 × 10" 78 r.p.m., Othello Records R-201 / 10" LP (L-201)
1954?	Let Freedom Sing	10" LP, Othello Records L-301
1956?	Негритянские песни в исполнении Поля Робсона (lit. 'Negro songs performed by Paul Robeson')	USSR, 10" LP, Д-2723/2724
1956?	Песни в исполнении Поля Робсона (lit. 'Songs performed by Paul Robeson')	USSR, 10" LP, Д-2864/2865
1958	Наш друг Поль Робсон (lit. 'Our friend Paul Robeson')	USSR, 12" LP, Д-04478/04479
1958	Robeson	12" LP, Vanguard Records VSD-2015
1959	Paul Robeson: Favorite Songs	12" LP, Monitor Records MPS 580, MPS 580
1959	Paul Robeson chante... 16 spirituals	France, 10" LP, Philips G 05.639 R
1960	Paul Robeson singt Lieder aus aller Welt ("Paul Robeson Sings Songs of Many Lands")	West Germany, 12" LP, Concert Hall M-2123
1960	"Encore, Robeson!" (Paul Robeson: Favorite Songs, Vol. 2)	12" LP, Monitor Records MP 581, MPS 581
1960	Robeson	12" LP, Verve Records MG V-4044
1962	Paul Robeson singt Negro Spirituals a.k.a. Negro Spirituals	Europe, 12" LP, Concert Hall M-2162
1964	Paul Robeson singt	East Germany, 12" LP, Eterna 8 30 008

== Live albums ==
Year	Album	Label
1952	I Came to Sing	10" LP, International Union of Mine Mill and Smelters Workers Union
1955	Récital Paul Robeson	France, 10" LP, Le Chant du Monde LDP 8132 (LD-M 8132), LDP 4248; Recorded by Othello Rec. Corp.
1957	Paul Robeson's Transatlantic Concert	UK, 10" LP, Topic Records 10T 17
1957	Transatlantic Exchange: Various artists	UK, 10" LP, N.U.M MLP 3001
1958	Поль Робсон в Москве (1958 г.) ("Paul Robeson in Moscow (1958)")	USSR, 12" LP, Д-04544/04545
1960	Paul Robeson at Carnegie Hall	12" LP, Vanguard VSD-2035
1961	Paul Robeson Recital	Czechoslovakia, 12" LP, Supraphon SUA 10062
1962	Paul Robeson at Carnegie Hall, Vol. 2	Australia, 12" LP, Vanguard ALPS 1010
1970	In Live Performance	12" LP, Columbia Masterworks M 30424

== Compilation albums ==
Year	Album	Label
1949	Spirituals and A Robeson Recital of Popular Favorites	12" LP, Columbia Masterworks, ML 4105
1956	Paul Robeson Sings	10" LP, Philips, SBR 6247
1957	Emperor of Song!	10" LP, His Master's Voice, DLP 1165
1964	Ballad for Americans / Carnegie Hall Concert, Vol. 2^{[A]}	12" LP, Vanguard VSD-79193, VRS-9193
1968	Songs of Free Men / Spirituals	12" LP, Columbia Odyssey, 32 16 0268
1972	Songs of My People	12" LP, RCA Red Seal, LM-3292
1974	The Essential Paul Robeson	2 × 12" LP, Vanguard, VSD-57/58
1976	Ballad for Americans	12" LP RCA Victrola, AVM1-1736
1976	Ol' Man River	12" LP CBS, CBS 88157
1985	Paul Robeson Sings "Ol' Man River" and Other Favorites	Recorded for EMI May 15, 1928 – September 27, 1939; 12" LP, CD, EMI EG 26 0477 1, CDC 7 47839 2

^{[A]} The LP contains the original recording of Ballad for Americans (courtesy of RCA Victor) and the live Carnegie Hall Concert, Vol. 2.

- Paul Robeson: The Complete EMI Sessions, 1928−1939 Box Set
- Paul Robeson: The Power and The Glory
- On My Journey: Paul Robeson's Independent Recordings
- Paul Robeson: The Political Years
- Freedom Train and the Welsh Transatlantic Concert Live
