= Paul Robeson: Favorite Songs =

Studio album by Paul Robeson
- Released: 1959
- Label: Monitor

Professional ratings
Review scores
Source	Rating
Billboard	Positive ("Spotlight" pick)

Paul Robeson: Favorite Songs is a studio album by Paul Robeson, released on Monitor in 1959.

== Track listing ==
The album was originally issued in 1959 as a long-playing record, catalog numbers MP 580 (mono) and MPS 580 (stereo).

Robeson is accompanied by Alan Booth on piano (except where indicated).

Side A
No.	Title	Writer(s)	Comments	Length
1.	"Hammer Song"		with Sonny Terry, harmonica, Brownie McGhee, guitar
2.	"Water Me from the Lime Rock"
3.	"Scandalize My Name"	arranged by H. T. Burleigh
4.	"Jacob's Ladder"
5.	"Witness"	arranged by Lawrence Brown
6.	"Stand Still, Jordan"
7.	"Takin' Names"
8.	"Swing Low, Sweet Chariot"

Side B
No.	Title	Writer(s)	Comments	Length
1.	"Hassidic Chant: Kaddish"	arranged by J. Engel
2.	"Wanderer" (Finnish folk song)	arranged by Selim Palmgren
3.	"Songs My Mother Taught Me"	Antonín Dvořák
4.	"Vi azoi lebt der keyser" (Yiddish folk song)		Lawrence Brown, piano Sung in Yiddish
5.	"The Minstrel Boy" (English ballad)	words by Thomas Moore
6.	"The Orphan"	Modest Mussorgsky	Sung in Russian
7.	"Zog nit keynmol" (Song of the Warsaw Ghetto)	arranged by Lawrence Brown	Sung in English and Yiddish
8.	"Joe Hill"	Earl Robinson and Alfred Hayes
