= Peat Bog Soldiers =

20th-century European protest song

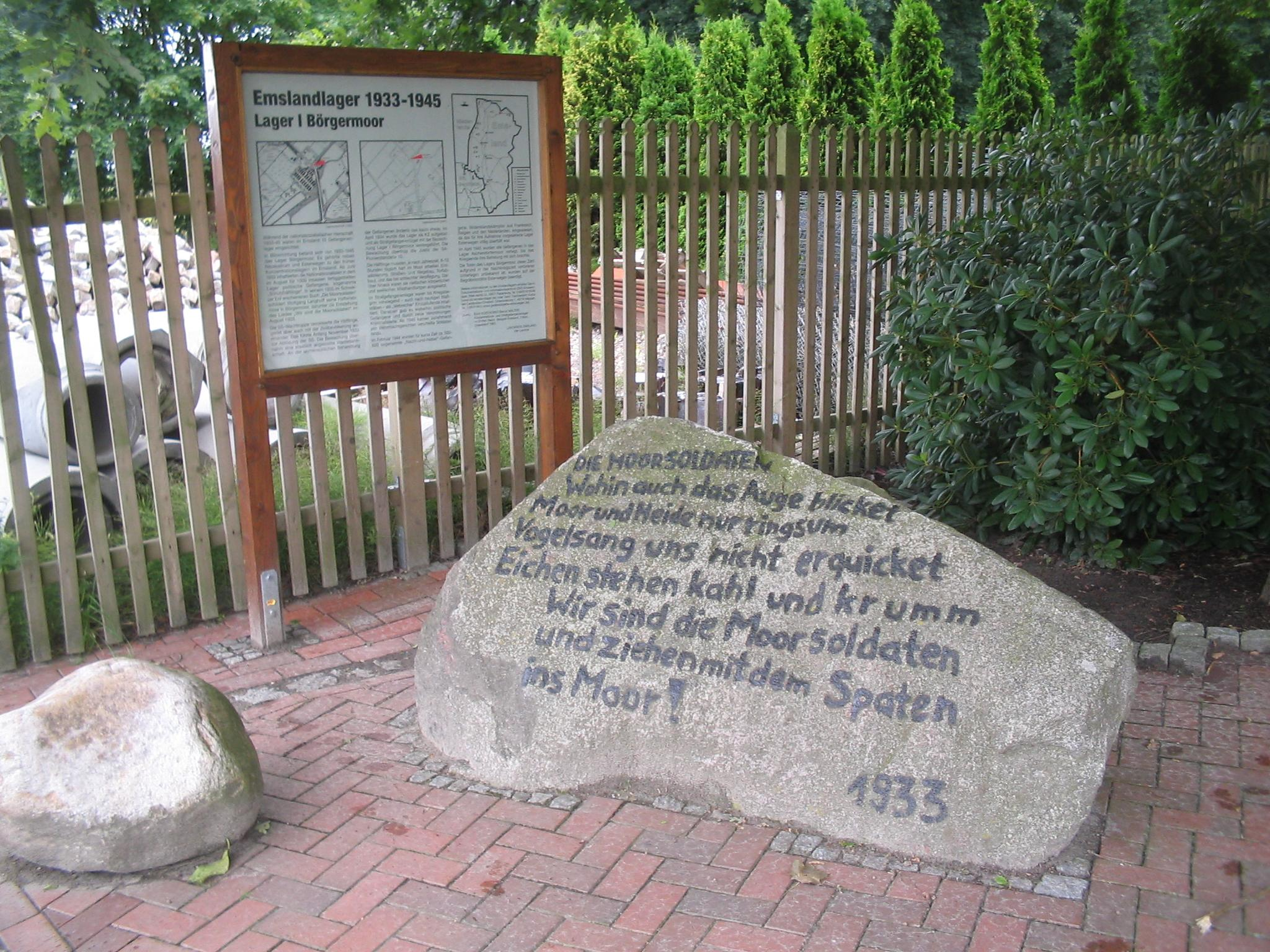
Memorial at the place of the entry to the former concentration camp "Börgermoor", where the song originated. The stone shows the first verse in German.

"Peat Bog Soldiers" (German: Die Moorsoldaten) is one of Europe's best-known protest songs. It exists in countless European languages and became a Republican anthem during the Spanish Civil War. It was a symbol of resistance during the Second World War and is popular with the Peace movement today. It was written, composed and first performed by prisoners in 1933 in a Nazi concentration camp.

== Background ==
This song was written by prisoners in the Nazi labour camp Papenburg in Lower Saxony, Germany. The Emslandlager ("Emsland camps") – as they were known – were for political opponents of the Third Reich, located outside of Börgermoor, now part of the commune Surwold, not far from Papenburg. A memorial of these camps, the Dokumentations- und Informationszentrum (DIZ) Emslandlager, is located at Papenburg.

In 1933, one camp, KZ Börgermoor, held about 1,000 Socialist and Communist internees. They were banned from singing existing political songs so they wrote and composed their own. The words were written by Johann Esser (a miner) and Wolfgang Langhoff (an actor); the music was composed by Rudi Goguel and was later adapted by Hanns Eisler and Ernst Busch. When creating it for Busch, Eisler made several changes to the rhythm, including condensing the meter into two-four time.

It was first performed at a Zircus Konzentrani ("concentration camp circus", a word play on circus Sarrasani) on 28 August 1933 at Börgermoor camp. Here is Rudi Goguel's description of it:

The sixteen singers, mostly members of the Solinger workers choir, marched in holding spades over the shoulders of their green police uniforms (our prison uniforms at the time). I led the march, in blue overalls, with the handle of a broken spade for a conductor's baton. We sang and by the end of the second verse nearly all of the thousands of prisoners present gave voice to the chorus. With each verse, the chorus became more powerful and, by the end, the SS – who had turned up with their officers – were also singing, apparently because they too thought themselves "peat bog soldiers". When they got to [the last line], ... "No more the peat bog soldiers / Will march with our spades to the moor.", the sixteen singers rammed their spades into the ground and marched out of the arena; leaving behind their spades which now had, sticking out of the peat bog, become crosses.

The song has a slow simple melody, reflecting a soldier's march, and is deliberately repetitive, echoing and telling of the daily grind of hard labour in harsh conditions. It was popular with German refugees in London in the 1930s and was used as a marching song by the German volunteers of the International Brigades during the Spanish Civil War. It was soon picked up by other nationalities and it appears in almost all the collected anthologies of Spanish Civil War songs.

== Lyrics ==
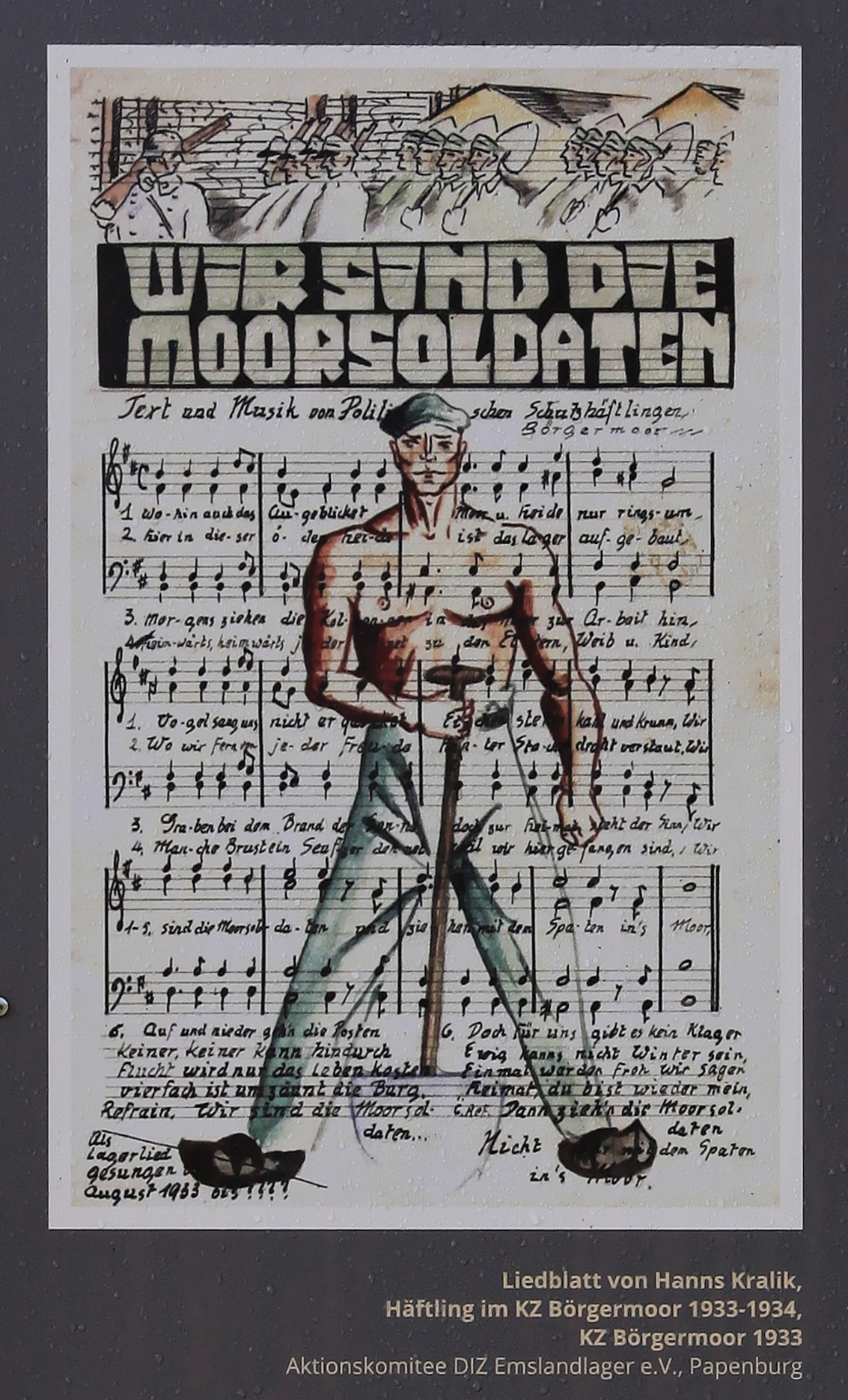
Words and music

Langhoff and Esser's original song runs to six verses, plus refrains (see below). For performance – and, therefore, for most translation – shorter lyrics are used. These omit verses two, three and four of the original.

Wohin auch das Auge blicket,
Moor und Heide nur ringsum.
Vogelsang uns nicht erquicket,
Eichen stehen kahl und krumm.
Refrain:
𝄆 Wir sind die Moorsoldaten
und ziehen mit dem Spaten ins Moor. 𝄇

Hier in dieser öden Heide
ist das Lager aufgebaut,
wo wir fern von jeder Freude
hinter Stacheldraht verstaut.
Refrain

Morgens ziehen die Kolonnen
in das Moor zur Arbeit hin.
Graben bei dem Brand der Sonne,
doch zur Heimat steht der Sinn.
Refrain

Heimwärts, heimwärts jeder sehnet,
zu den Eltern, Weib und Kind.
Manche Brust ein Seufzer dehnet,
weil wir hier gefangen sind.
Refrain

Auf und nieder geh'n die Posten,
keiner, keiner kann hindurch.
Flucht wird nur das Leben kosten,
vierfach ist umzäunt die Burg.
Refrain

Doch für uns gibt es kein Klagen,
ewig kann's nicht Winter sein,
einmal werden froh wir sagen:
Heimat du bist wieder mein.
Final refrain:
𝄆 Dann zieh'n die Moorsoldaten
nicht mehr mit dem Spaten ins Moor. 𝄇

Far and wide as the eye can wander,
Heath and bog are everywhere.
Not a bird sings out to cheer us,
oaks are standing gaunt and bare.
Chorus:
𝄆 We are the peat bog soldiers,
Marching with our spades to the moor. 𝄇

Here in this desolate moorland
the camp is built,
Where we live without any joy
behind barbed wire.
Chorus

In the morning, the columns march
towards the moor to work,
digging under the searing sun,
but home is on their mind.
Chorus

Homewards, homewards everybody longs
for parents, wife and child.
Some chests heave with a sigh,
because we are imprisoned here.
Chorus

Up and down the guards are pacing,
no one, no one can get through.
Flight would mean a sure death, facing
guns and barbed wire greet our view.
Chorus

But for us there is no complaining,
winter will in time be passed.
One day we will cry rejoicing:
Homeland, dear, you're mine at last!
Final chorus:
𝄆 Then will the peat bog soldiers
march no more with their spades to the bog 𝄇.

== Music ==
=== Original ===
Source

=== Eisler arrangement ===
Source

== Renditions & Covers ==
Paul Robeson included "The Peat-Bog Soldiers" on his album of antiwar and protest songs, Songs of Free Men.

In 1965, "The Chad Mitchell Trio" released a cover of the song in both English & German on their album Violets of Dawn.

"The Dubliners", released their version of the song in English in 1970 on their album Revolution.

Swan Arcade sang a truncated English-language version on their first LP in 1973.

In 2017, Irish folk band “Lankum” released a cover of the song in English in the album Between The Earth And Sky.
