= Spirituals (Paul Robeson album) =

Studio album by Paul Robeson
- Released: 1946
- Recorded: 1945
- Label: Columbia Masterworks

Paul Robeson chronology
Songs of Free Men (1943)	Spirituals (1946)	A Robeson Recital of Popular Favourites (1947)

Spirituals (1946)
Review scores
Source	Rating
Record Supplement	Positive

Songs of Free Men / Spirituals (budget LP, 1968)
Review scores
Source	Rating
Billboard	4/4 stars

Spirituals is a studio album by Paul Robeson, recorded in 1945 and released in 1946 on Columbia Masterworks. Robeson was accompanied by Lawrence Brown at the piano.

== Track listing ==
The album was originally issued in 1946 as a set of four 10-inch 78-r.p.m. records, catalog number M 610.

No.	Title	Writer(s)	Length
1.	"Go Down Moses"
2.	"Balm in Gilead"
3.	"By an' By"
4.	"Sometimes I Feel like a Motherless Child"
5.	"John Henry"
6.	"Water Boy"	Robeson
7.	"Nobody Knows de Trouble I've Seen"
8.	"Joshua Fit de Battle of Jericho"
