= Paul Robeson at Carnegie Hall =

Live album by Paul Robeson
- Released: 1959
- Label: Vanguard

Professional ratings
Review scores
Source	Rating
AllMusic	4.5/5 stars
Billboard	Positive ("Spotlight" pick)

Paul Robeson at Carnegie Hall is a live album by Paul Robeson, released in 1959 on Vanguard Records.

== Track listing ==
The album was originally issued in 1959 as a long-playing record, catalog numbers VSD-2035 (stereo) and VRS 9051 (mono).

Side one
No.	Title	Writer(s)	Length
1.	"Every Time I Feel the Spirit"	arr. Lawrence Brown
2.	"Balm in Gilead"	arr. H. T. Burleigh
3.	"Volga Boat Song"
4.	"Monologue from Shakespeare's Othello"	Shakespeare
5.	"O Thou Silent Night"	Alexandrov
6.	"Chinese Children's Song"
7.	"My Curley Headed Baby"	George H. Clutsam
8.	"Old Man River"	Jerome Kern
9.	"Going Home"	Antonín Dvořák, arr. Fisher

Side two
No.	Title	Writer(s)	Length
1.	"Monologue from Boris Godunov"	Modest Mussorgsky
2.	"The Orphan"	Modest Mussorgsky
3.	"Christ lag in Todesbanden"	Johann Sebastian Bach
4.	"Didn't My Lord Deliver Daniel"	arr. Lawrence Brown
5.	"Lullaby"	Franz Schubert
6.	"O No John"	arr. Cecil Sharp
7.	"Joe Hill"	Earl Robinson
8.	"Jacob's Ladder"
