= Swing Low, Sweet Chariot (album) =

Studio album by Paul Robeson
- Released: 1949
- Label: Columbia Masterworks

Professional ratings
Review scores
Source	Rating
Billboard	Good (76/100)

Swing Low, Sweet Chariot is a studio album by Paul Robeson, released in 1949 on Columbia Masterworks. Robeson was accompanied on piano by Lawrence Brown, who also provided additional vocals on some of the tracks.

== Track listing ==
The album was issued in 1949 as a set of four 10-inch 78-r.p.m. records, catalog number MM 819 and as a 10" LP, catalog number ML 2038.

Side 1
No.	Title	Length
1.	"Swing Low, Sweet Chariot"
2.	"Ev'ry Time I Feel de Spirit"

Side 2
No.	Title	Length
1.	"I Got a Home in Dat Rock"
2.	"O Gimme Your Han'"

Side 3
No.	Title	Length
1.	"No More Auction Block"
2.	"Great Gittin' Up Mornin'"

Side 4
No.	Title	Length
1.	"Hear de Lam's A-Cryin'"
2.	"Goin' to Ride Up in de Chariot"

Side 5
No.	Title	Length
1.	"I'll Hear de Trumpet"
2.	"Ezekial Saw de Wheel"

Side 6
No.	Title	Length
1.	"Poor Wayfarin' Stranger"
2.	"Hammer Song"

Side 7
No.	Title	Length
1.	"Dere's a Man Goin' 'Round"
2.	"I Know de Lord"

Side 8
No.	Title	Length
1.	"Git on Board, Little Chillen"
2.	"Lil' David"
