= Joe Hill (song) =

Song
- Released: 1936
- Genre: Folk
- Composer: Earl Robinson
- Lyricist: Alfred Hayes

"Joe Hill", also known as "I Dreamed I Saw Joe Hill Last Night", is a folk song named after the labor activist Joe Hill. It was originally written as a poem by Alfred Hayes and then composed into music by Earl Robinson in 1936. The song recounts a dream in which Joe Hill appears and claims he never died despite being framed for murder and shot by "the copper bosses." He tells the dreamer, "From San Diego up to Maine / In every mine and mill / Where workers strike and organize / It's there you'll find Joe Hill."

== Reception ==
In 2014, the Paul Robeson version of the song was the third-most requested song by British Labour politicians on Desert Island Discs, behind "Jerusalem" and "Nkosi Sikelel' iAfrika", with the song also chosen by then-party leader Ed Miliband.

== Covers and adaptations ==
- Paul Robeson released the song on his albums Songs of Free Men (1943), Paul Robeson: Favorite Songs (1959) and the live album Paul Robeson at Carnegie Hall (1959)
- Joan Baez performed the song at the Woodstock music festival in 1969 and later included it in her album, One Day at a Time.
- The Dubliners released a version of the song on their 1970 album Revolution. It was later released as part of the Definitive Luke Kelly Collection in 2010.
- Billy Bragg released a modified version in 1990 called "I Dreamed I Saw Phil Ochs Last Night" about the prolific protest singer from the 1960s.
- The High Kings performed a faster, more upbeat cover of the song while on tour in 2011 and later included it in their album, Live in Ireland.
- On International Workers' Day in 2014, at Tampa, Florida, Bruce Springsteen and the E Street Band opened their show with a cover of the song.
