= Songs of Free Men =

- CD reissue cover

Studio album by Paul Robeson
- Released: 1943
- Recorded: 1942
- Label: Columbia Masterworks

Paul Robeson chronology
| Chee Lai – Songs of New China (1941) | Songs of Free Men (1943) | Spirituals (1946) |

Songs of Free Men (1943)
Review scores
| Source | Rating |
|---|---|
| Billboard | positive |

Songs of Free Men / Spirituals (budget LP, 1968)
Review scores
| Source | Rating |
|---|---|
| Billboard | 4/4 stars |

Songs of Free Men is a studio album by Paul Robeson, recorded in early 1942 and released on Columbia Masterworks in 1943.

== Track listing ==
The album was originally issued in 1943 as a set of four 10-inch 78-r.p.m. records, catalog number MM 543.

| No. | Title | Writer(s) | Comments | Length |
|---|---|---|---|---|
| 1. | "From Border to Border" (from Quiet Flows the Don) | Dzerzhinky | Sung in English and Russian |
| 2. | "Oh, How Proud Our Quiet Don" (from Quiet Flows the Don) | Dzerzhinky | Sung in English and Russian |
| 3. | "The Purest Kind of a Guy" ("Joe's Birthday Song" from No for an Answer) | Blitzstein | Sung in English |
| 4. | "Joe Hill" | E. Robinson; A. Hayes | Sung in English |
| 5. | "The Peat-Bog Soldiers" ("Moorsoldaten": song from a German concentration camp) | | Sung in English and German |
| 6. | "The Four Insurgent Generals" (Spanish loyalist song) | Arr. Eisler | Sung in English and Spanish |
| 7. | "Native Land" | Dunayevsky | Sung in Russian and English |
| 8. | "Song of the Plains" | Arr. Knipper | Sung in English and Russian ("Polyushko-pole") |

== Charts ==
Songs of Free Men (1998)
Review scores
| Source | Rating |
|---|---|
| AllMusic | 5/5 stars |

In 1997, the album had a re-release on CD with 17 additional tracks including "Ol' Man River" from Showboat. It charted on Billboard's classical albums chart at number 47. Later, in the critics' poll published at the end of the year, the magazine's editor-in-chief Timothy White would list it among the best albums of 1998, at number 10 (tied with another Robeson's album, The Peace Arc Concerts).

| Chart (1998) | Peak position |
|---|---|
| US Top Classical Albums (Billboard) | 47 |
