= Alfred Hayes (writer) =

British-American screenwriter (1911–1985)

- Born: 18 April 1911; Whitechapel, London
- Died: 14 August 1985 (aged 74)
- Citizenship: United States of America
- Occupations: screenwriter, television writer, novelist, and poet
- Notable work: Joe Hill

Alfred Hayes (18 April 1911 – 14 August 1985) was an American screenwriter, television writer, novelist, and poet, who worked in Italy as well as the United States. His well-known poem about "Joe Hill" ("I dreamed I saw Joe Hill last night") was set to music by Earl Robinson, and performed by Pete Seeger, Joan Baez, Paul Robeson, and many other artists.

== Life ==
Born in Whitechapel, London to a Jewish family that moved to the United States when he was three, Hayes grew up in New York City and graduated from the City College (now part of City University of New York). At the age of seventeen, he joined the Young Communist League. Hayes worked briefly as a copy boy for the New York American newspaper, before moving on to a job as a crime reporter for the New York Daily Mirror. He began writing fiction and poetry in left-wing magazines in the 1930s, such as the poem 'In a Coffee Pot', published in the first issue of Partisan Review. During World War II he served in Europe in the U.S. Army Special Services (the "morale division"). Afterwards, he stayed in Rome and became a screenwriter of Italian neorealist films.

His experience in Allied-occupied Rome served as the basis for his first two novels. All Thy Conquests (1947) is an episodic novel that follows several Americans and Italians over the course of a day in September 1944. The novel uses as its historical backdrop the massacre of the Fosse Ardeatine and the botched trial of fascist Pietro Caruso that devolved into a lynching, shocking the entire world. His second novel, The Girl on the Via Flaminia (1949), revisits the setting of Allied-occupied Rome, but focuses on a single, failed romance between the American officer, Robert, and the Italian, Lisa, whom he pays to play his wife.

Hayes rewrote one of the episodes of All Thy Conquests as part of his work as a co-writer on Roberto Rossellini's Paisan (1946), which earned him an Academy Award nomination; he received another Academy Award nomination for Teresa (1951). He was an uncredited co-writer of Vittorio De Sica's neorealist film Bicycle Thieves (1948) for which he also wrote the English language subtitles. He adapted The Girl on the Via Flaminia into a Broadway play in 1953, and that same year it was adapted into a French-language film Un acte d’amour and an English-language version, Act of Love.

Among his U.S. filmwriting credits are The Lusty Men (1952, directed by Nicholas Ray) and the film adaptation of the Maxwell Anderson/Kurt Weill musical Lost in the Stars (1974). His credits as a television scriptwriter included scripts for American series Alfred Hitchcock Presents, The Twilight Zone, Nero Wolfe and Mannix.

Decades after Hayes' death in August 1985, 3 of his novels, In Love (1953), My Face for the World to See (1958), and The End of Me (1968) were given new editions under The New York Review of Books' Classics imprint. In Love and My Face for the World to See were re-released in July 2013 and The End of Me in June 2020.

== Bibliography ==
=== Poetry ===
- The Big Time (1944)
- Welcome to the Castle (1950)
- Just Before the Divorce (1968)
- Joe Hill

=== Novels ===
- All Thy Conquests (1946)
- Shadow of Heaven (1947)
- The Girl on the Via Flaminia (1949)
- In Love (1953)
- My Face for the World to See (1958)
- The End of Me (1968)
- The Stockbroker, the Bitter Young Man, and the Beautiful Girl (1973)

=== Short stories ===
- The Temptation of Don Volpi (1960)
