= Paul Robeson =

American singer and activist (1898–1976)

- Robeson in 1942
- Born: Paul Leroy Robeson; April 9, 1898; Princeton, New Jersey, U.S.
- Died: January 23, 1976 (aged 77); Philadelphia, Pennsylvania, U.S.
- Resting place: Ferncliff Cemetery (Greenburgh, New York)
- Education: Rutgers University, New Brunswick (BA); New York University; Columbia University (LLB); SOAS University of London
- Occupations: Singer; actor; activist; athlete
- Known for: Show Boat; The Emperor Jones; Othello; All God's Chillun Got Wings
- Spouse: Eslanda Goode (m. 1921; died 1965)
- Children: Paul Robeson Jr.
- Parents: William Drew Robeson; Maria Louisa Bustill
- Relatives: Bustill family
- Football career
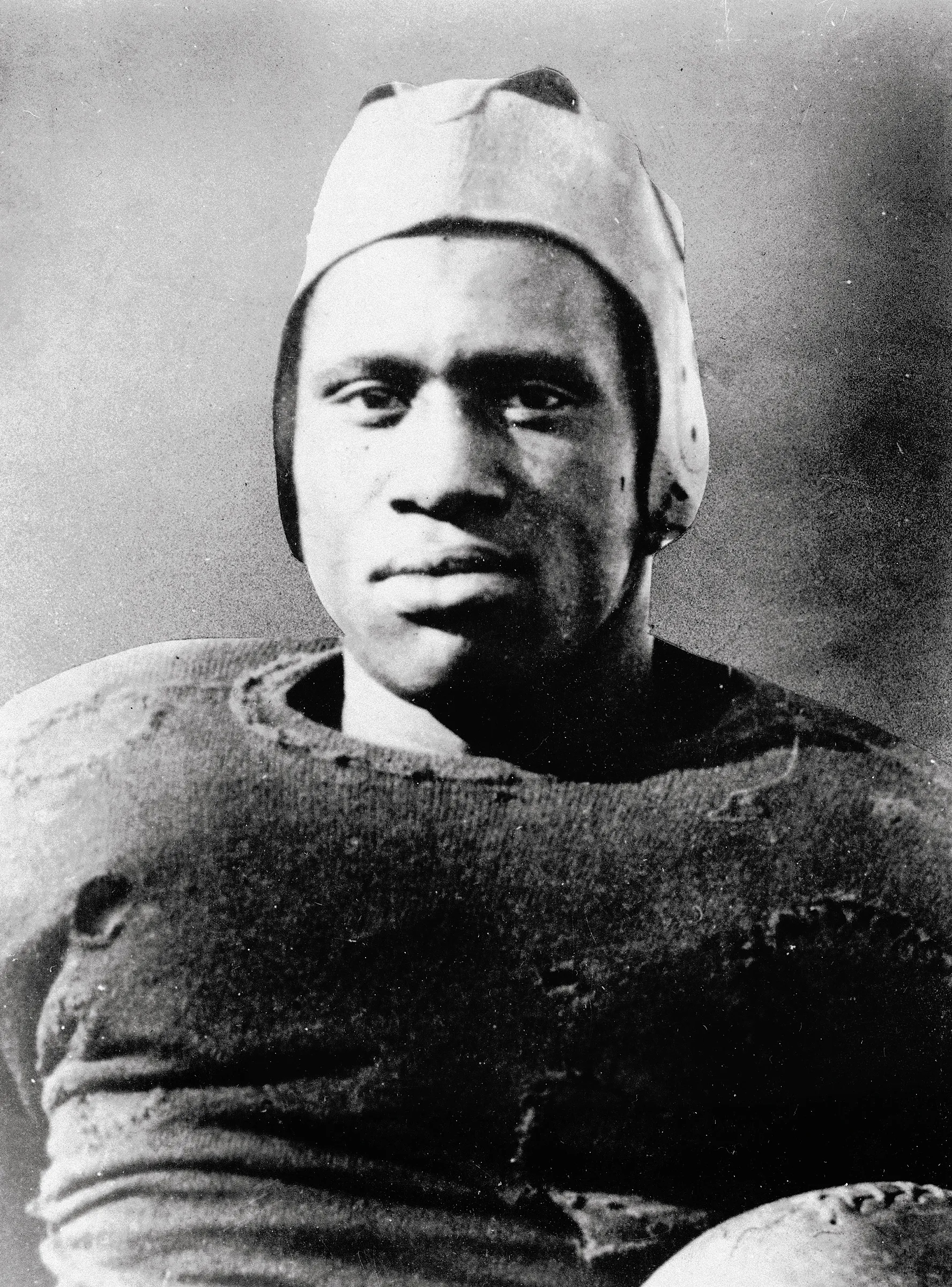
- Robeson in football uniform at Rutgers, c. 1919

No. 21, 17
- Position: End / tackle

Personal information
- Listed height: 6 ft 3 in (1.91 m)
- Listed weight: 219 lb (99 kg)

Career information
- High school: Somerville (NJ)
- College: Rutgers

Career history
- Akron Pros (1921); Milwaukee Badgers (1922)

Awards and highlights
- 2× Consensus All-American (1917, 1918)

Career statistics
- Games played: 15
- Games started: 15
- Touchdowns: 2
- Stats at Pro Football Reference
- College Football Hall of Fame

Paul Leroy Robeson (/ˈroʊbsən/ ROHB-sən; April 9, 1898 – January 23, 1976) was an American bass-baritone concert artist, actor, professional football player, and activist who became famous both for his cultural accomplishments and for his political stances.

In 1915, Robeson won an academic scholarship to Rutgers College in New Brunswick, New Jersey, where he was the only African-American student. While at Rutgers, he was twice named a consensus All-American in football and was elected class valedictorian. He earned his LLB degree from Columbia Law School while playing in the National Football League (NFL). After graduation, he became a figure in the Harlem Renaissance, with performances in Eugene O'Neill's The Emperor Jones and All God's Chillun Got Wings.

Robeson performed in Britain in the touring melodrama Voodoo in 1922, and in Emperor Jones in 1925. In 1928, he scored a major success in the London premiere of Show Boat. Living in London for several years with his wife Eslanda, Robeson continued to establish himself as a concert artist, and he starred in a London production of Othello, the first of three productions of the play over the course of his career. He also gained attention in Sanders of the River (1935) and in the film production of Show Boat (1936).

Robeson's political activities began with his involvement with unemployed workers and anti-imperialist students in Britain, and it continued with his support for the Republican cause during the Spanish Civil War, the Soviet Union and Joseph Stalin, and his involvement in the Council on African Affairs.

During the Second World War, Robeson initially opposed Allied war efforts and U.S. entry into the conflict during the Molotov–Ribbentrop Pact, but he became a highly vocal supporter of the war efforts after the German invasion of the Soviet Union. His history of supporting Soviet policies brought scrutiny from the Federal Bureau of Investigation (FBI). After the war, the Council on African Affairs was placed on the Attorney General's List of Subversive Organizations. Robeson was investigated during the McCarthy era. When he refused to recant his public advocacy for the Soviet Union, the U.S. State Department withdrew his passport, and his income plummeted. He moved to Harlem and published a periodical called Freedom, which was critical of United States policies, from 1950 to 1955. Robeson's right to travel was eventually restored as a result of the 1958 United States Supreme Court decision Kent v. Dulles.

Between 1925 and 1961, Robeson released recordings of about 270 songs. The first of these was the spiritual "Steal Away", backed with "Were You There", in 1925. Robeson's recorded repertoire spanned many styles, including Americana, popular standards, classical music, European folk songs, political songs, poetry, and spoken excerpts from plays.

== Early life ==
=== 1898–1915: Childhood ===
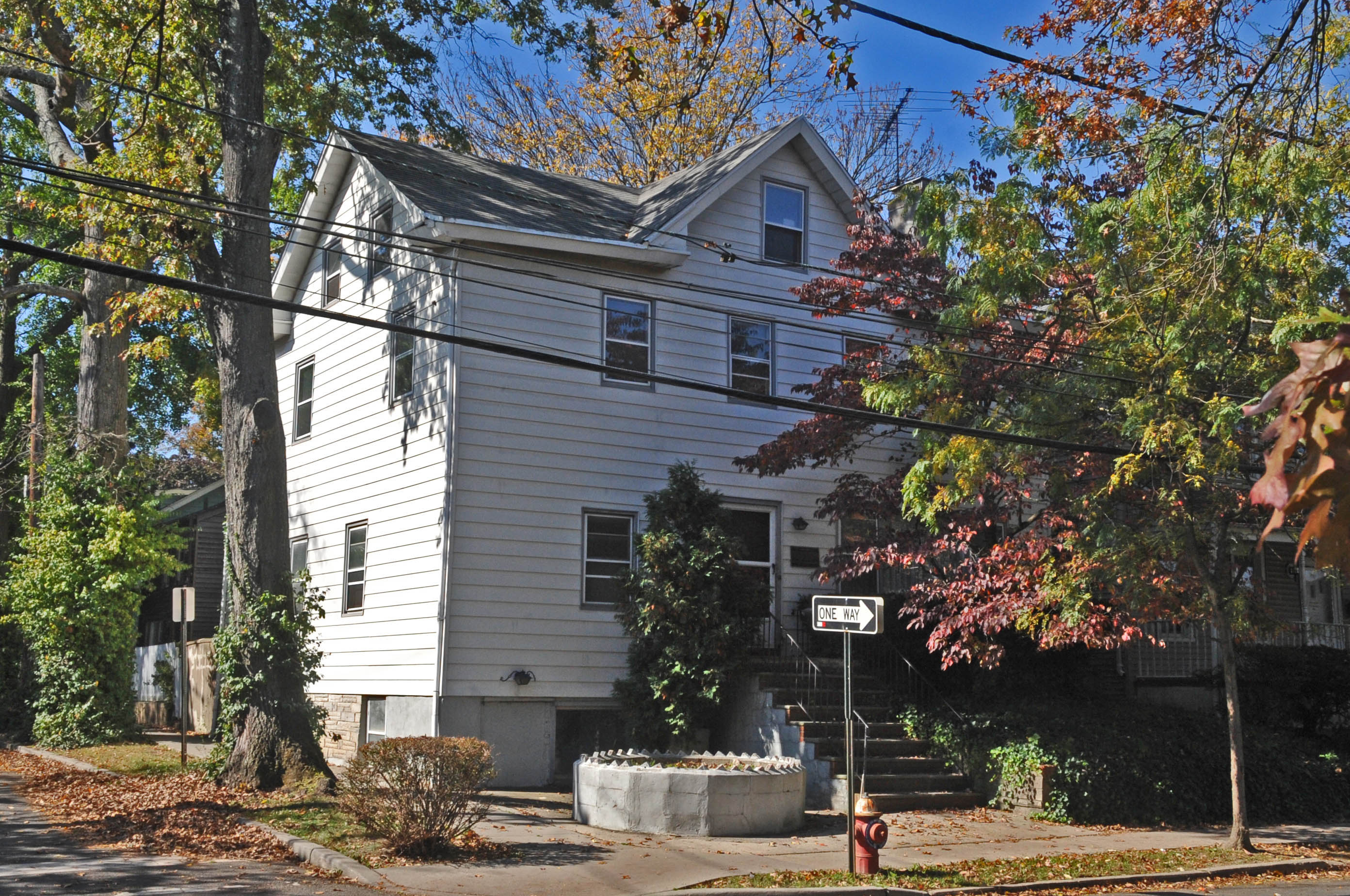
Robeson's birthplace in Princeton, New Jersey

Robeson was born in Princeton, New Jersey, in 1898, to Reverend William Drew Robeson and Maria Louisa Bustill. His mother was a member of the Bustills, a prominent Quaker family of mixed ancestry. His father was of Igbo origin and was born into slavery. William escaped from a plantation in his teens and eventually became the minister of Princeton's Witherspoon Street Presbyterian Church in 1881. Robeson had three brothers: William Drew Jr. (born 1881), Reeve (born c. 1887), and Ben (born c. 1893); and one sister, Marian (born c. 1895).

In 1900, a disagreement between William and white financial supporters of the Witherspoon church arose with apparent racial undertones, which were prevalent in Princeton. William, who had the support of his entirely black congregation, resigned in 1901. The loss of his position forced him to work menial jobs. Three years later, when Robeson was six, his mother, who was nearly blind, died in a house fire. Eventually, William became financially incapable of providing a house for himself and his children still living at home, Ben and Paul, so they moved into the attic of a store in Westfield, New Jersey.

William found a stable parsonage at the St. Thomas A.M.E. Zion in 1910, where Robeson filled in for his father during sermons when he was called away. In 1912, Robeson began attending Somerville High School in New Jersey, where he performed in Julius Caesar and Othello, sang in the chorus, and excelled in football, basketball, baseball, and track. His athletic dominance elicited racial taunts, which he ignored. Prior to his graduation, he won a statewide academic contest for a scholarship to Rutgers and was named class valedictorian. He took a summer job as a waiter in Narragansett Pier, Rhode Island, where he befriended Fritz Pollard, later to be the first African-American coach in the National Football League.

=== 1915–1919: Rutgers College ===
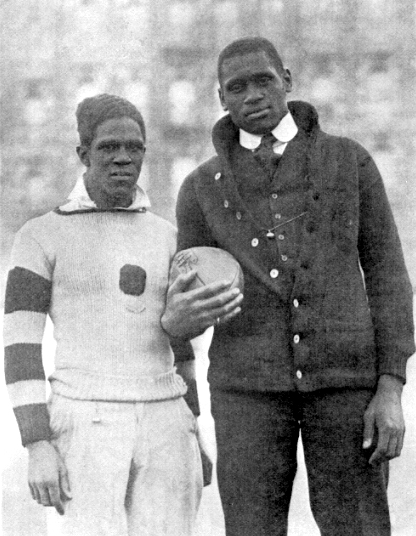
Fritz Pollard (left) and Robeson in a photo from the March 1918 issue of The Crisis

In late 1915, Robeson became the third African-American student ever enrolled at Rutgers, and the only one at the time. He tried out for the Rutgers Scarlet Knights football team, and his resolve to make the squad was tested when his teammates engaged in excessive play, during which his nose was broken and his shoulder dislocated. The coach, Foster Sanford, decided that Robeson had overcome the provocation and announced that he had made the team.

Robeson joined the Rutgers debating team. He sang off-campus for spending money and on-campus with the Glee Club informally, as membership required attending all-white mixers. He also joined the other collegiate athletic teams. As a sophomore, amidst Rutgers' sesquicentennial celebration, Robeson was benched when a Southern football team, Washington and Lee University, refused to take the field because the Scarlet Knights had fielded an African American.

After a standout junior year of football, he was recognized in The Crisis for his athletic, academic, and singing talents. At that time his father fell grievously ill. Robeson took the sole responsibility in caring for him, shuttling between Rutgers and Somerville. His father, who was the "glory of his boyhood years" soon died, and at Rutgers, Robeson expounded on the incongruity of African Americans fighting to protect America during World War I but not having the same opportunities in the United States as whites.

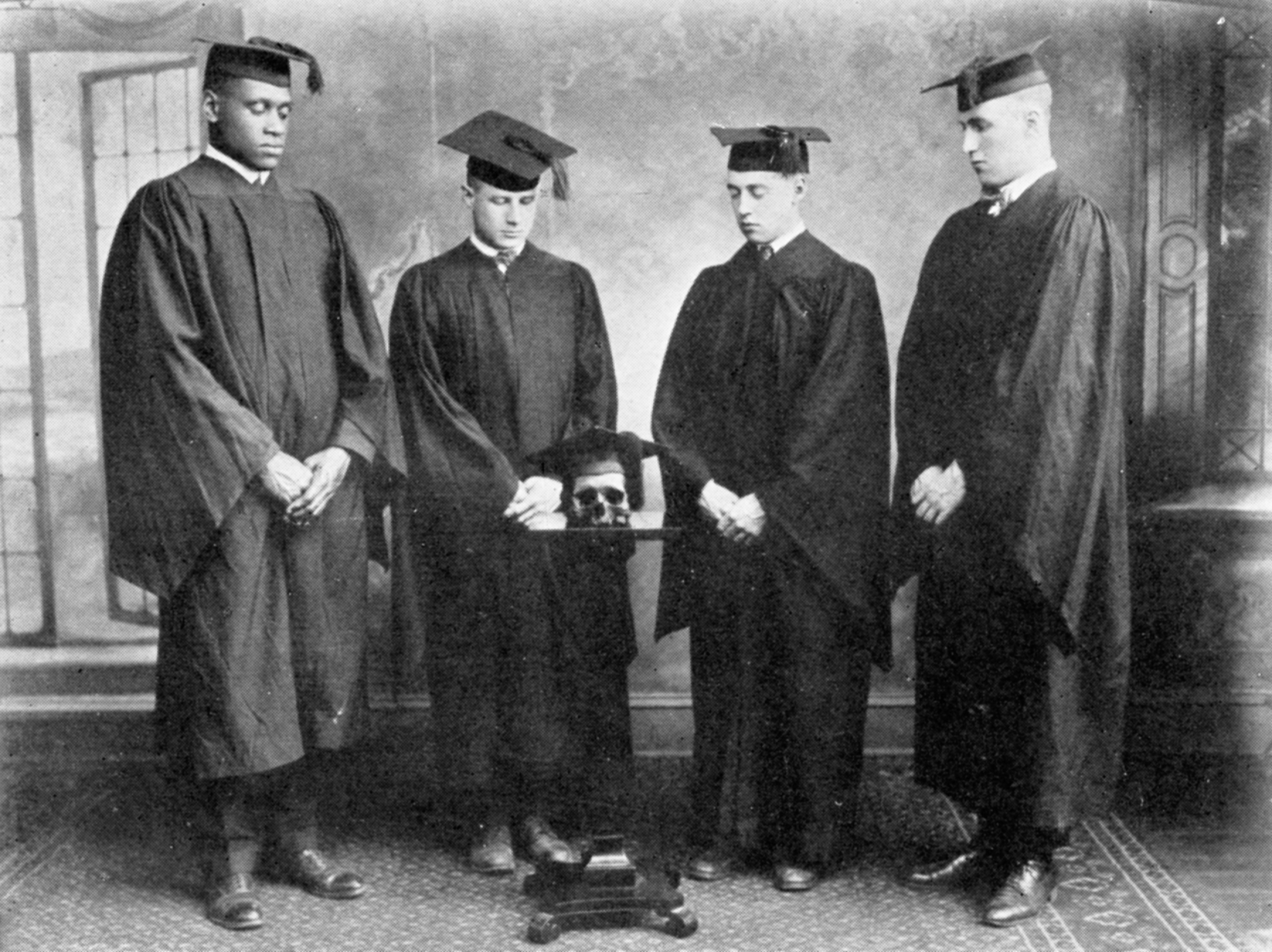
Robeson (far left) was part of the Rutgers University class of 1919 and one of four students accepted into the Cap and Skull honor society.

He finished university with four annual oratorical triumphs and varsity letters in multiple sports. His football playing as end won him first-team All-American selection in both his junior and senior years. Walter Camp considered him the greatest end ever. Academically, Robeson was accepted into Phi Beta Kappa and Cap and Skull. His classmates recognized him by electing him class valedictorian. The Daily Targum published a poem featuring his achievements. In his valedictory speech, he exhorted his classmates to work for equality for all Americans. At Rutgers, Robeson also gained a reputation for his singing. His voice was described as deep and rich; some saw it as bass with a high range, others as baritone with low notes. Throughout his career, Robeson was classified as a bass-baritone.

=== 1919–1923: Columbia Law School and marriage ===
Robeson entered New York University School of Law in the fall of 1919. To support himself, he became an assistant football coach at Lincoln University, where he joined the Alpha Phi Alpha fraternity. However, Robeson felt uncomfortable at NYU and moved to Harlem then transferred to Columbia Law School in February 1920. Already known in the black community for his singing, he was selected to perform at the dedication of the Harlem YWCA.

Robeson began dating Eslanda "Essie" Goode and after her coaxing, he made his theatrical debut as Simon in Ridgely Torrence's Simon the Cyrenian. After a year of courtship, they were married in August 1921.

Robeson was recruited by Fritz Pollard to play for the NFL's Akron Pros while he continued his law studies. In the spring of 1922, Robeson postponed school to portray Jim in Mary Hoyt Wiborg's play Taboo. He then sang in the chorus of an Off-Broadway production of Shuffle Along before he joined Taboo in Britain. The play was adapted by Mrs Patrick Campbell to highlight his singing. After the play's run ended, he befriended Lawrence Benjamin Brown, a classically trained musician, before returning to Columbia while playing for the NFL's Milwaukee Badgers. Robeson ended his football career after the 1922 season, and he graduated from Columbia Law School in 1923.

== Theatrical success and ideological transformation ==
=== 1923–1927: Harlem Renaissance ===
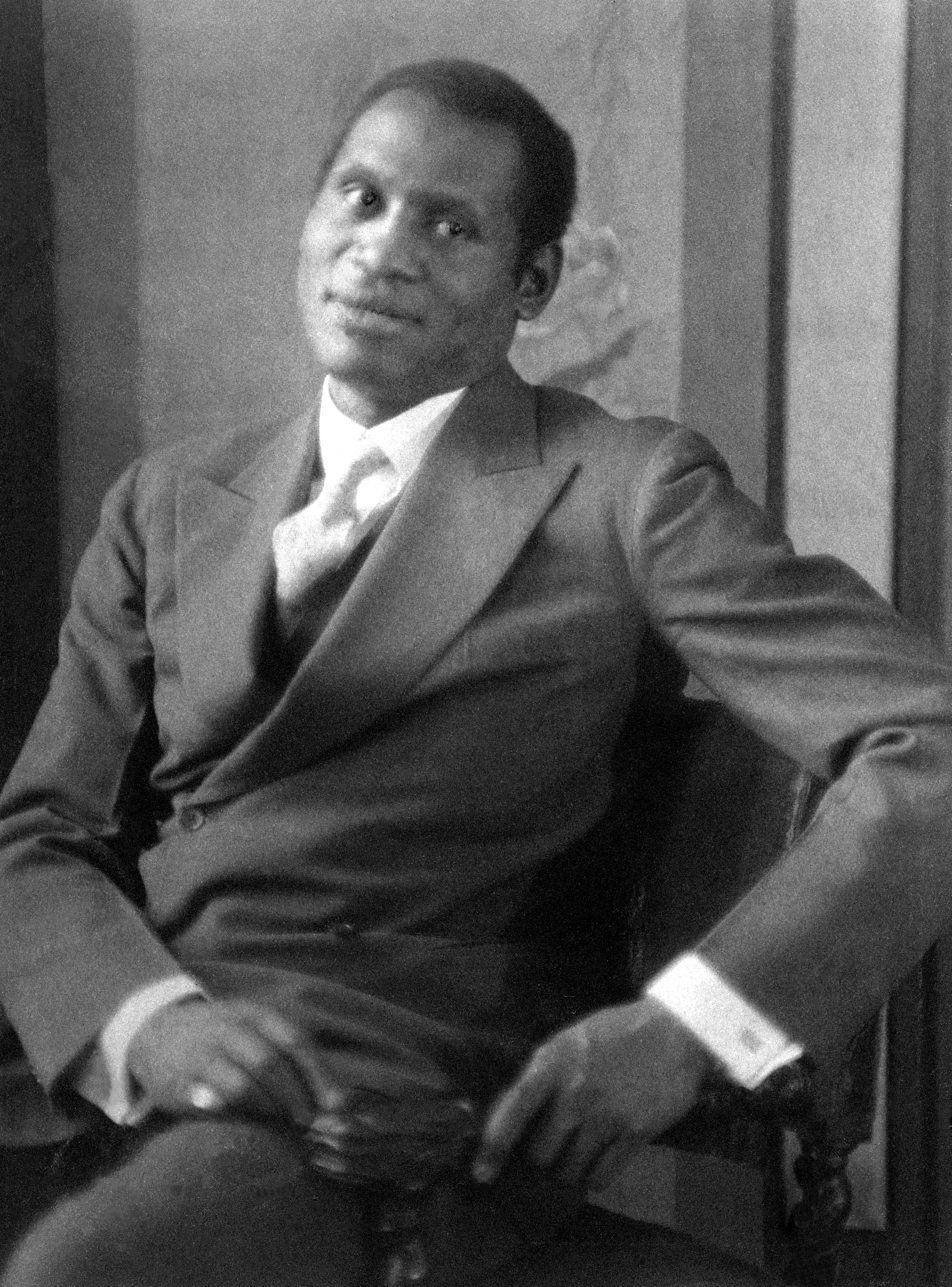
Portrait by Doris Ulmann c. 1924

Robeson briefly worked as a lawyer, but he renounced a career in law because of racism. His wife supported them financially. She was the head histological chemist in Surgical Pathology at New York-Presbyterian Hospital. She continued to work there until Robeson's career took off in 1925. The couple frequented the social functions at the future Schomburg Center. In December 1924, he landed the lead role of Jim in Eugene O'Neill's All God's Chillun Got Wings, which culminated with Jim metaphorically consummating his marriage with his white wife by symbolically emasculating himself. Chillun's opening was postponed due to a nationwide controversy over its plot.

Chillun's delay led to a revival of The Emperor Jones with Robeson as Brutus, a role pioneered by Charles Sidney Gilpin. The role terrified and galvanized Robeson, as it was practically a 90-minute soliloquy. Reviews declared him an unequivocal success. Though arguably clouded by its controversial subject, his Jim in Chillun was less well received. He answered criticism of its plot by writing that fate had drawn him to the "untrodden path" of drama, that the true measure of a culture is in its artistic contributions, and that the only true American culture was African American.

The success of his acting placed him in elite social circles, and his rise to fame, which was forcefully aided by Essie, happened very rapidly. Essie's ambition for Robeson was a startling dichotomy to his indifference. She quit her job, became his agent, and negotiated his first movie role in a silent race film directed by Oscar Micheaux, Body and Soul (1925). To support a charity for single mothers, Robeson headlined a concert singing spirituals. He also performed his repertoire of spirituals on the radio.

Lawrence Benjamin Brown, a renowned pianist who toured with gospel singer Roland Hayes, chanced upon Robeson in Harlem. The two ad-libbed a set of spirituals, with Robeson as lead and Brown as accompanist. This so enthralled them that they booked Provincetown Playhouse for a concert. The pair's rendition of African-American folk songs and spirituals was captivating, and Victor Records signed Robeson to a contract in September 1925.

The Robesons went to London for a revival of The Emperor Jones before spending the rest of the fall on holiday on the French Riviera, socializing with Gertrude Stein and Claude McKay. Robeson and Brown performed a series of concert tours in America from January 1926 until May 1927.

During a hiatus in New York, Robeson learned that Essie was several months pregnant. Paul Robeson Jr. was born in November 1927 in New York, while Robeson and Brown were touring Europe. Essie experienced complications from the birth, and by mid-December, her health had deteriorated dramatically. Ignoring Essie's objections, her mother wired Robeson and he immediately returned to her bedside. Essie completely recovered after a few months.

=== 1928–1932: Show Boat, Othello, and marriage difficulties ===
In 1928, Robeson played "Joe" in the London production of the American musical Show Boat at the Theatre Royal, Drury Lane. His rendition of "Ol' Man River" became the benchmark for all future performers of the song. In fact, Jerome Kern told friends he formulated the melody to "Ol' Man River" in 1926 after hearing the "organ-like tones' of Robeson's speaking voice. Soon after, Kern met with Robeson in his Harlem apartment where Kern played piano while Robeson sang the new song.

Some black critics objected to Show Boat due to its use of the then-common racial epithet "nigger". It was, nonetheless, immensely popular with white audiences. Of his 1932 Broadway performance of the song, novelist Edna Ferber noted, "I have never seen an ovation like that given any figure of the stage...That audience stood up and howled...The show stopped. He sang it again. The show stopped. They called him back again and again."

Robeson was summoned for a Royal Command Performance at Buckingham Palace and was befriended there by Members of Parliament from the House of Commons. Show Boat continued for 350 performances and, as of 2001, it remained the Royal's most profitable venture. The Robesons bought a home in the Hampstead area of London. He reflected on his life in his diary and wrote that it was all part of a "higher plan" and "God watches over me and guides me. He's with me and lets me fight my own battles and hopes I'll win." After Robeson was refused seating at the Savoy Grill, he issued a press release describing the incident and insult, which subsequently became a matter of public debate.

Following the 1928 success of Showboat in London, Robeson undertook a provincial concert tour of the U.K. that took in Blackpool, Birmingham, Torquay, Brighton, Eastbourne, Folkestone, Margate, Hastings, Southsea, as well as Douglas, Isle of Man, building an audience by "singing in the summer at the spas and seaside resorts" as a way to reach the British public.

Essie had learned early in their marriage that Robeson had extramarital affairs, but she initially tolerated them. However, she unfavorably altered the characterization of him in his biography and defamed him by describing him with "negative racial stereotypes". Despite her uncovering of this tryst, there was no public evidence that their relationship had soured.

The couple appeared in the experimental Swiss film Borderline (1930). Robeson then returned to the Savoy Theatre in London's West End to play the title role of Othello, opposite Peggy Ashcroft as Desdemona. He cited the lack of a "racial problem" in London as significant in his decision to move to there. Robeson was the first black actor to play Othello in Britain since Ira Aldridge. The production received mixed reviews that noted Robeson's "highly civilized quality [but lacking the] grand style". Robeson stated the best way to diminish the oppression that African Americans faced was for his artistic work to be an example of what "men of my colour" could accomplish rather than to "be a propagandist and make speeches and write articles about what they call the Colour Question."

After Essie discovered that Robeson had been having an affair with Ashcroft, she sought a divorce and they separated. While working in London, Robeson became one of the first artists to record at the new EMI Recording Studios (later known as Abbey Road Studios), recording four songs in September 1931, almost two months before the studio was officially opened.

Robeson returned to Broadway as Joe in the 1932 revival of Show Boat with Maude Simmons and others to critical and popular acclaim. He received, with immense pride, an honorary master's degree from Rutgers. It is said that Foster Sanford, his college football coach, advised him that divorcing Essie and marrying Ashcroft would do irreparable damage to his reputation. In any case, Ashcroft and Robeson's relationship ended in 1932, and Robeson and Essie reconciled, but their relationship was permanently scarred.

=== 1933–1937: Ideological awakening ===
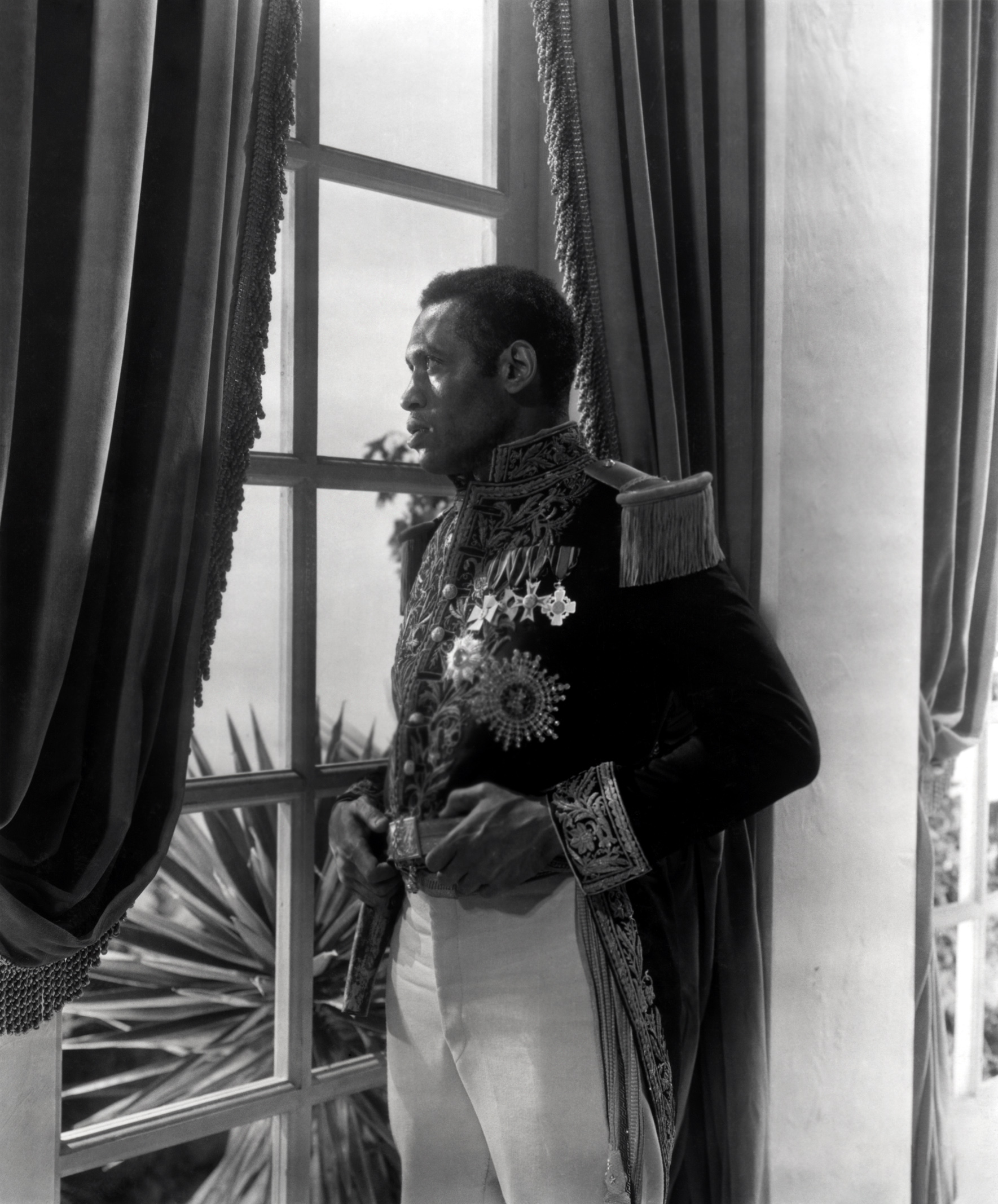
Robeson as Brutus Jones, 1933

In 1933, Robeson played the role of Jim in the London production of Chillun virtually gratis, then returned to the United States to star as Brutus in the film The Emperor Jones – the first film to feature an African American in a starring role, "a feat not repeated for more than two decades in the U.S." His acting in The Emperor Jones was well received. On the film set he rejected any slight to his dignity, despite the widespread Jim Crow atmosphere in the United States. Upon returning to England, he publicly criticized African Americans' rejection of their own culture. Despite negative reactions from the press, such as a New York Amsterdam News retort that Robeson had made a "jolly well [ass of himself]", he also announced that he would reject any offers to perform central European (though not Russian, which he considered "Asiatic") opera because the music had no connection to his heritage.

In early 1934, Robeson enrolled in the School of Oriental and African Studies, a constituent college of the University of London, where he studied phonetics and Swahili. His "sudden interest" in African history and its influence on culture coincided with his essay "I Want to be African", wherein he wrote of his desire to embrace his ancestry.

His friends in the anti-imperialist movement and his association with British socialists led him to visit the Soviet Union. Robeson, Essie, and Marie Seton traveled to the Soviet Union on an invitation from Sergei Eisenstein in December 1934. A stopover in Berlin enlightened Robeson to the racism in Nazi Germany and, on his arrival in Moscow, Robeson said: "Here I am not a Negro but a human being for the first time in my life ... I walk in full human dignity."

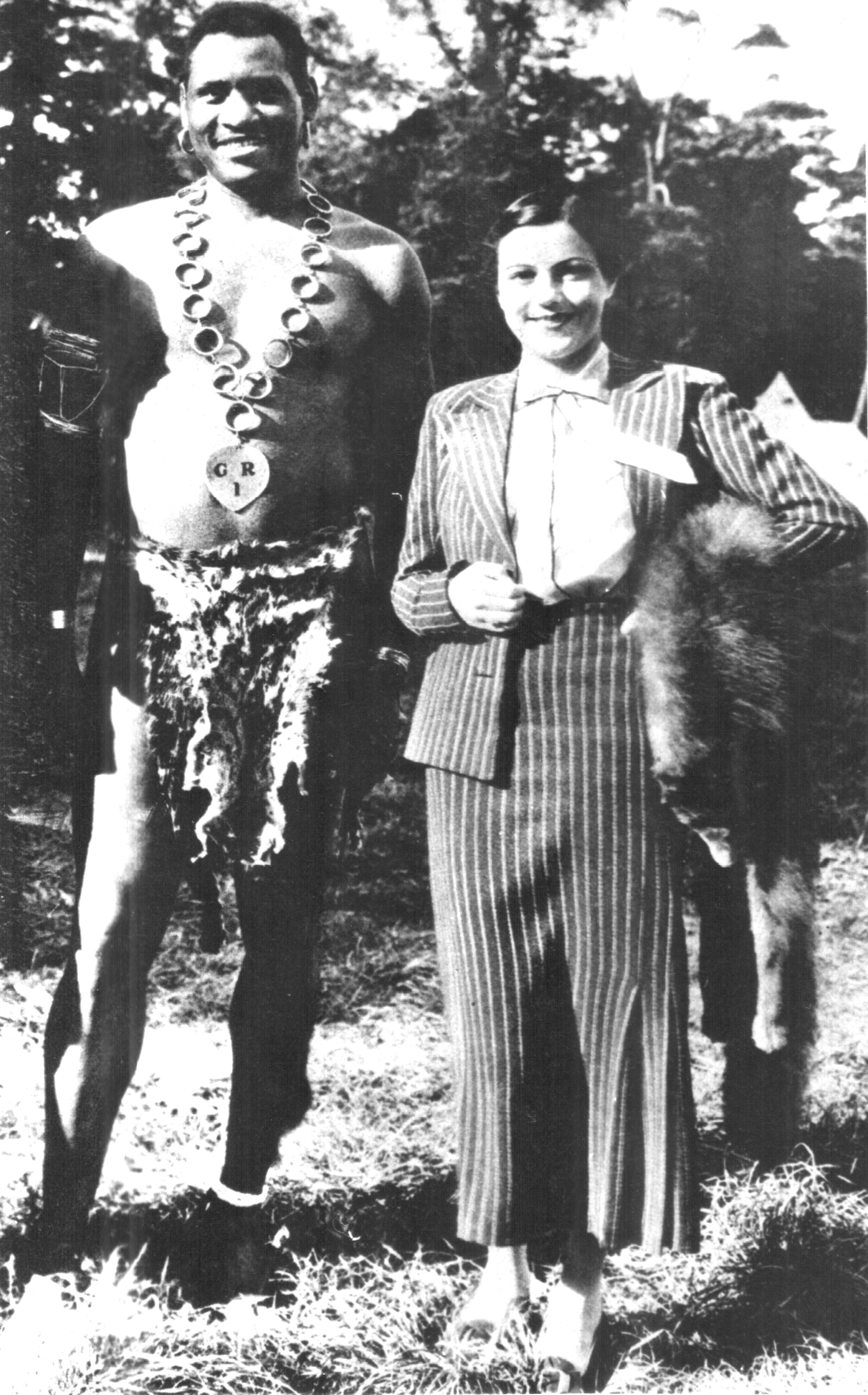
Robeson and actress Irén Ágay on the set of Sanders of the River, London, 1934

He undertook the role of Bosambo in the movie Sanders of the River (1935) with the intent of rendering a realistic view of colonial African culture. Sanders of the River made Robeson an international movie star; but the stereotypical portrayal of a colonial African was seen as embarrassing to his stature as an artist and damaging to his reputation. The Commissioner of Nigeria to London protested the film as slanderous to his country, and Robeson thereafter became more politically conscious in his choice of roles. He appeared in the play Stevedore at the Embassy Theatre in London in May 1935, with a cast that included Black actors of American, English, African, as well as West Indian background (such as Robert Adams and Kathleen Davis). The production was favorably reviewed in The Crisis by Nancy Cunard, who concluded: "Stevedore is extremely valuable in the racial – social question – it is straight from the shoulder". In early 1936, he decided to send his son to school in the Soviet Union to shield him from racist attitudes.

Robeson then played the role of Toussaint Louverture in the eponymous play by C. L. R. James at the Westminster Theatre, and he appeared in the films Song of Freedom and Show Boat in 1936, and My Song Goes Forth, King Solomon's Mines and Big Fella, all in 1937. In 1938, he was named by American Motion Picture Herald as the 10th most popular star in British cinema.

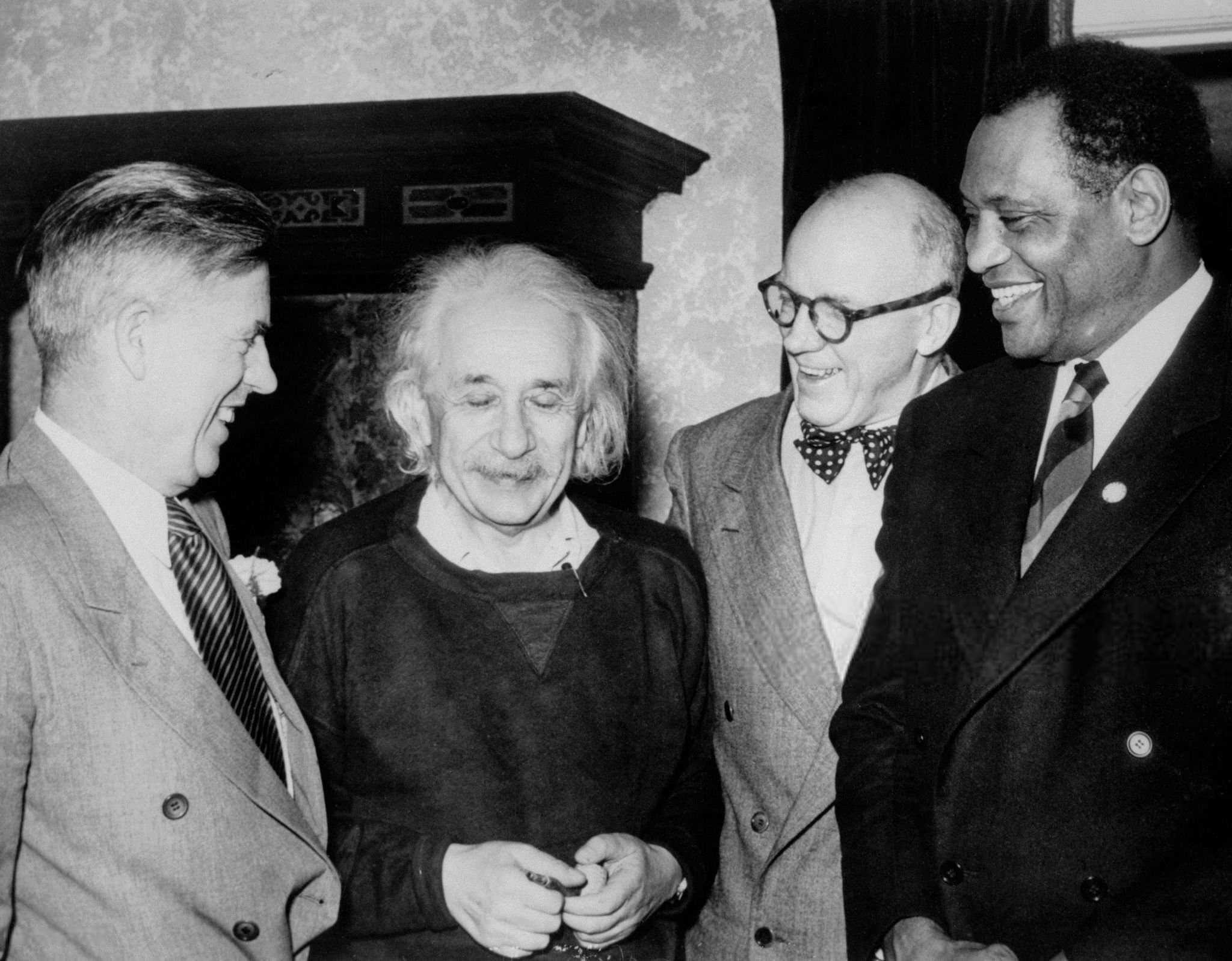
Robeson (far right) with Henry A. Wallace, Albert Einstein and Frank Kingdon at Einstein's home in Princeton, New Jersey, September 21, 1947

In 1935, Robeson met Albert Einstein when Einstein came backstage after Robeson's concert at the McCarter Theatre. The two discovered that, as well as a mutual passion for music, they shared a hatred for fascism. The friendship between Robeson and Einstein lasted nearly twenty years but was not well known or publicized.

=== 1937–1939: Spanish Civil War and political activism ===
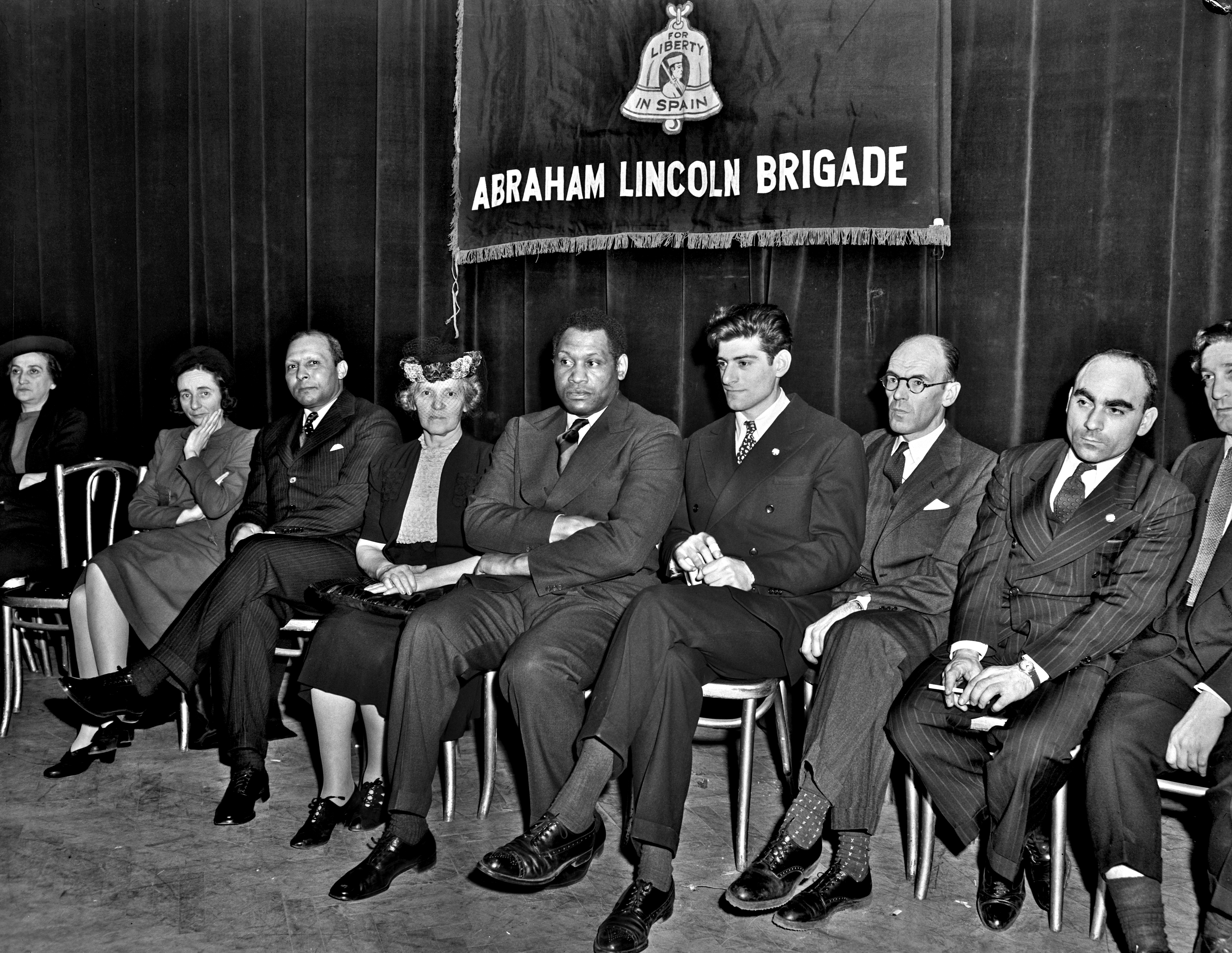
Robeson at an event honoring those killed in the Abraham Lincoln Brigade, February 26, 1941. Seated to his left is former Lincoln Battalion commander Milton Wolff.

Robeson believed that the struggle against fascism during the Spanish Civil War was a turning point in his life and transformed him into a political activist. In 1937, he used his concert performances to advocate the Republican cause and the war's refugees. He permanently modified his renditions of "Ol' Man River"—initially, by singing the word "darkies" instead of "niggers"; later, by changing some of the stereotypical dialect in the lyrics to standard English and replacing the fatalistic last verse ("Ah gits weary / An' sick of tryin' / Ah'm tired of livin' / An skeered of dyin'") with an uplifting verse of his own ("But I keep laffin' / Instead of cryin' / I must keep fightin' / Until I'm dyin'")—transforming it from a tragic "song of resignation with a hint of protest implied" into a battle hymn of unwavering defiance. His business agent expressed concern about his political involvement, but Robeson overruled him and decided that contemporary events trumped commercialism. In Wales, he commemorated the Welsh people killed while fighting for the Republicans by recording a message that became his epitaph: "The artist must take sides. He must elect to fight for freedom or slavery. I have made my choice. I had no alternative."

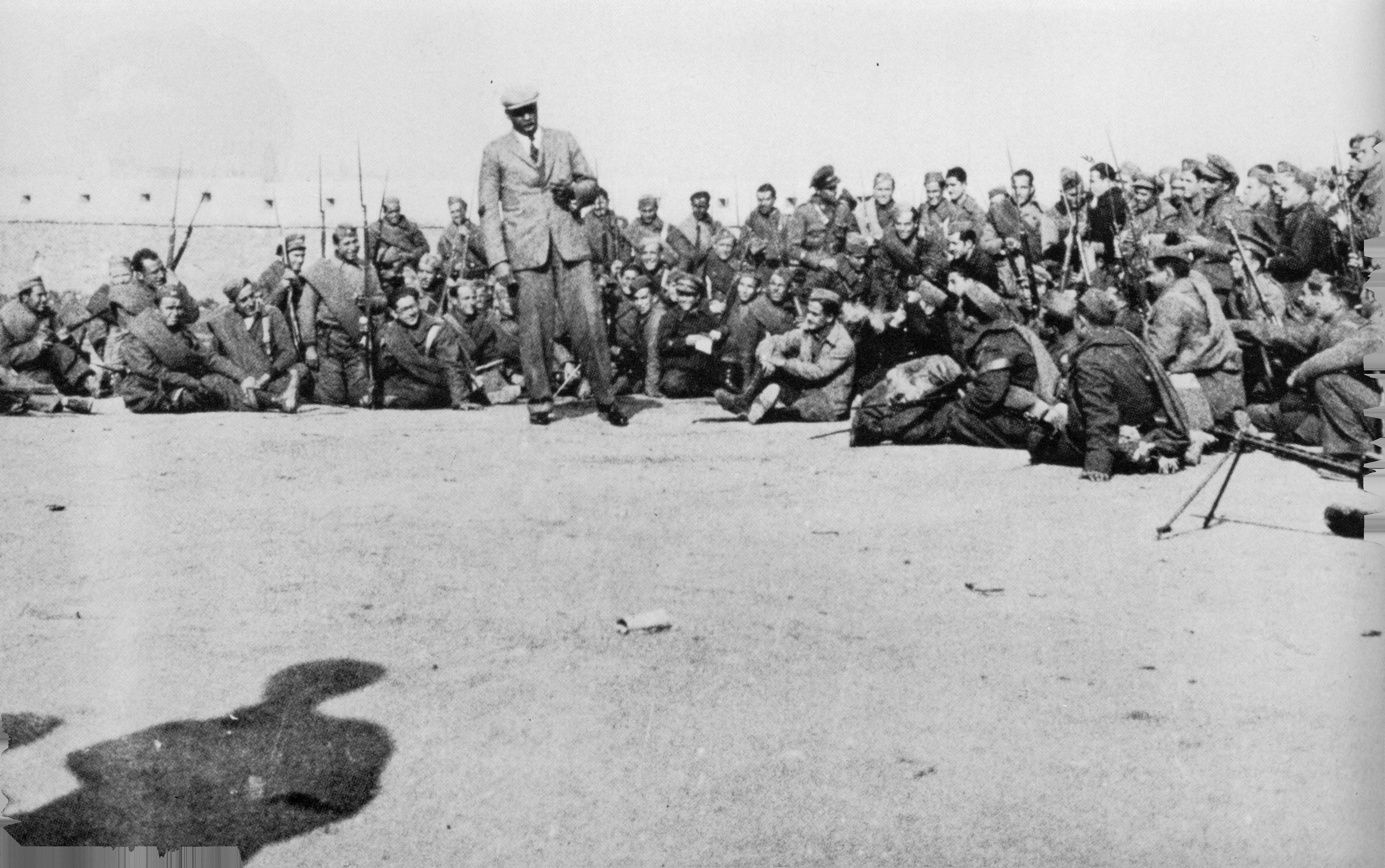
Robeson sings for soldiers of the Abraham Lincoln Brigade at Teruel, January 1938

After an invitation from J. B. S. Haldane, he traveled to Spain in 1938 because he believed in the International Brigades's cause. There, he visited the hospital of Benicàssim, singing to the wounded soldiers. Robeson also visited the battlefront and provided a morale boost to the Republicans at a time when their victory was unlikely. Back in England, he hosted Jawaharlal Nehru to support Indian independence, whereat Nehru expounded on imperialism's affiliation with Fascism. Robeson reevaluated the direction of his career and decided to focus on the ordeals of "common people". At London's Unity Theatre, he appeared in the British premiere of Ben Bengal's pro-labor play Plant in the Sun: he played the central figure of Peewee, a man of Irish descent, in a role usually taken by a white actor. With Max Yergan and the International Committee on African Affairs (later known as the Council on African Affairs), Robeson became an advocate for African nationalism and political independence.

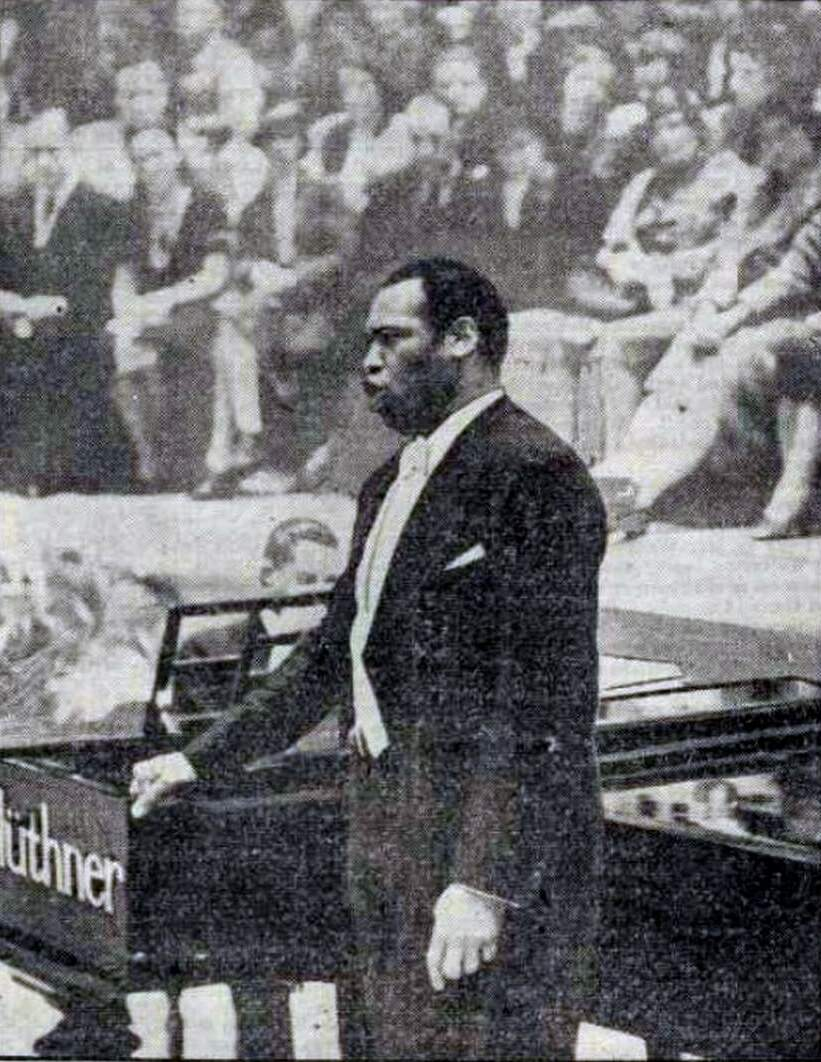
Robeson performs at Birmingham Town Hall, England, on March 7, 1939, in aid of a local charity, the Birmingham Mail Christmas Tree Fund. The advertised pianist was Lawrence Brown.

Robeson lived in Britain until the start of the Second World War in 1939. His name was included in the Sonderfahndungsliste G.B. as a target for arrest if Germany had occupied Britain.

== Political activism and McCarthy-era persecution ==
=== 1939–1945: World War II, and the Broadway Othello ===
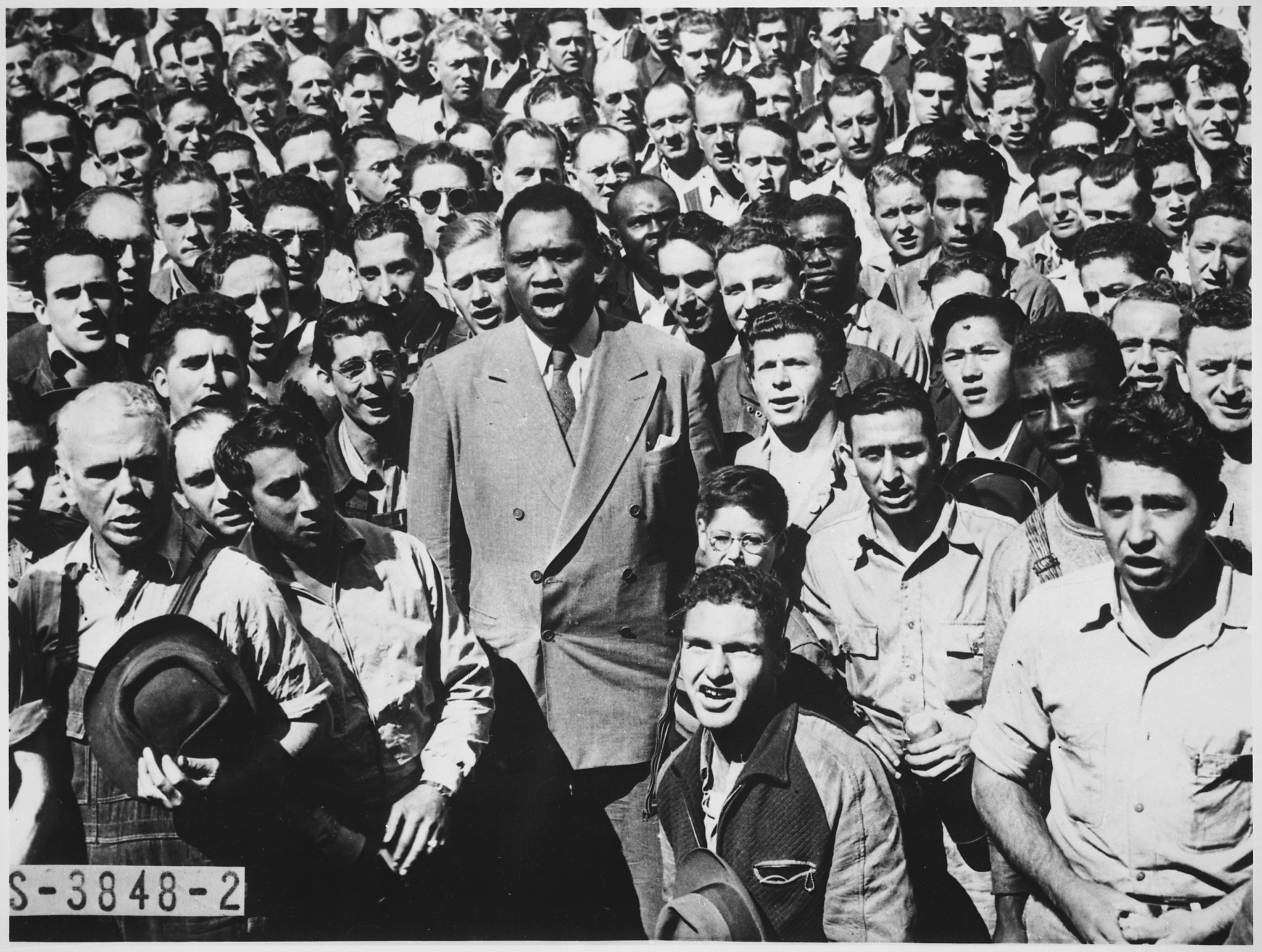
Robeson leading Moore Shipyard (Oakland, California) workers in singing the "Star Spangled Banner", September 1942

Robeson's last British film was The Proud Valley (1940), set in a Welsh coal-mining town. The film was still being shot at the beginning of September 1939 when Germany invaded Poland, leading to Britain declaring war. Several weeks later, just after the completion of filming, Robeson and his family returned to the United States, arriving in New York in October 1939. They lived at first in the Sugar Hill neighborhood of Harlem, and in 1941 settled in Enfield, Connecticut.

After his well-received performance of Ballad for Americans on a live CBS radio broadcast on November 5, with a repeat performance on New Year's Day 1940, the song became a popular seller. In 1940, the magazine Collier's named Robeson America's "No. 1 entertainer". Nevertheless, during a tour in 1940, the Beverly Wilshire Hotel was the only major Los Angeles hotel willing to accommodate him due to his race. Robeson paid an exorbitant rate and registered under an assumed name, and he therefore dedicated two hours every afternoon to sitting in the lobby, where he was widely recognised, "to ensure that the next time Black[s] come through, they'll have a place to stay." Los Angeles hotels lifted their restrictions on black guests soon afterward.

Robeson narrated the 1942 documentary Native Land, which was labeled by the FBI as communist propaganda. After an appearance in Tales of Manhattan (1942), a production that he felt was "very offensive to my people" because of the way the segment was handled in stereotypes, he announced that he would no longer act in films because of the demeaning roles available to blacks.

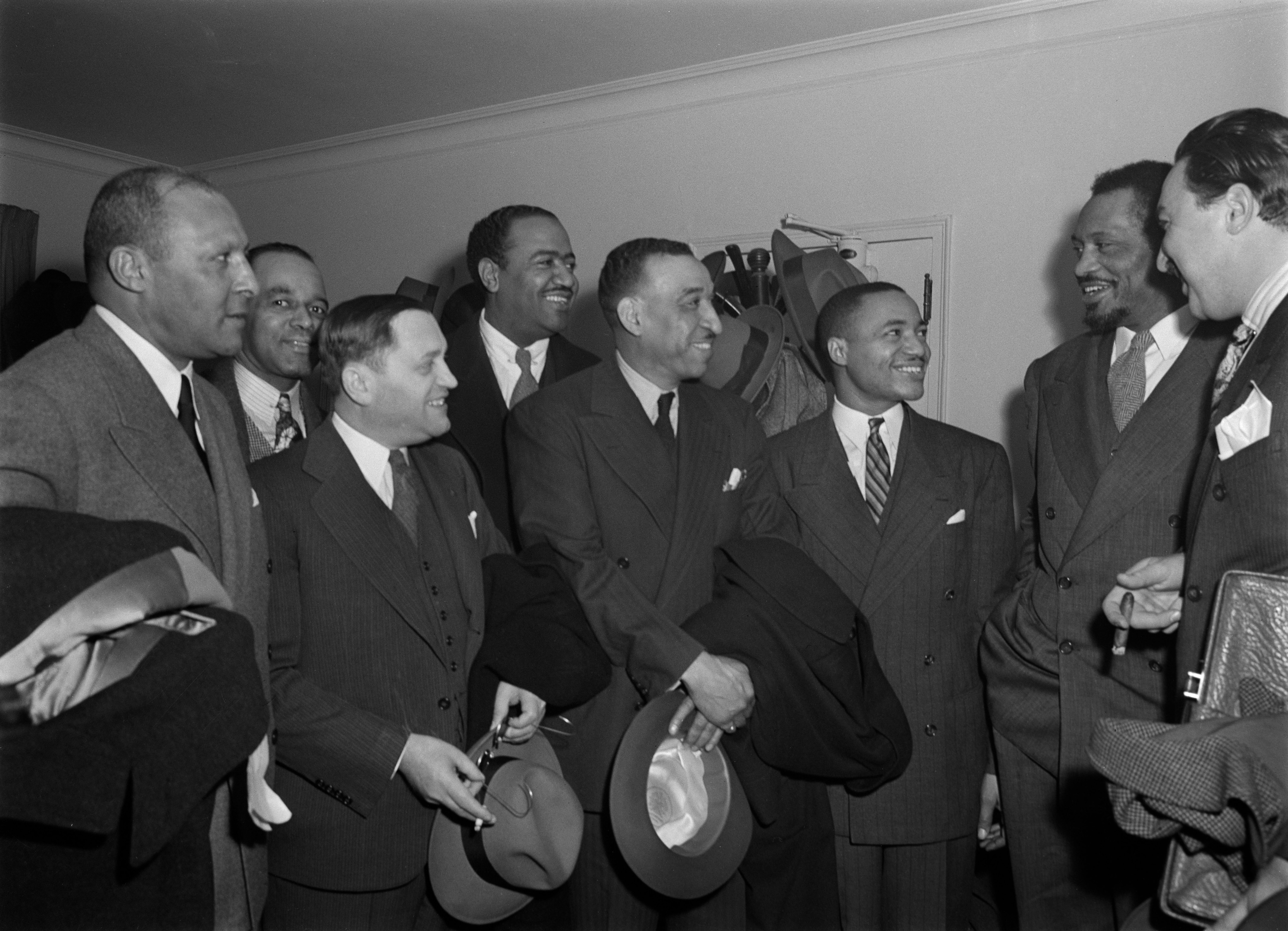
Members of an anti-color line delegation to Major League Baseball, December 3, 1943 Left to right: Max Yergan, Robert Murphy, Peter V. Cacchione, Benjamin J. Davis Jr., C. B. Powell, Ira F. Lewis, Paul Robeson, and Adam Clayton Powell Jr.

According to Barry Finger's critical appraisal of Robeson, while the Hitler-Stalin pact was still in effect, Robeson counseled American blacks that they had no stake in the rivalry of European powers. After Russia was attacked, he urged blacks to support the war effort, warning that an Allied defeat would "make slaves of us all".

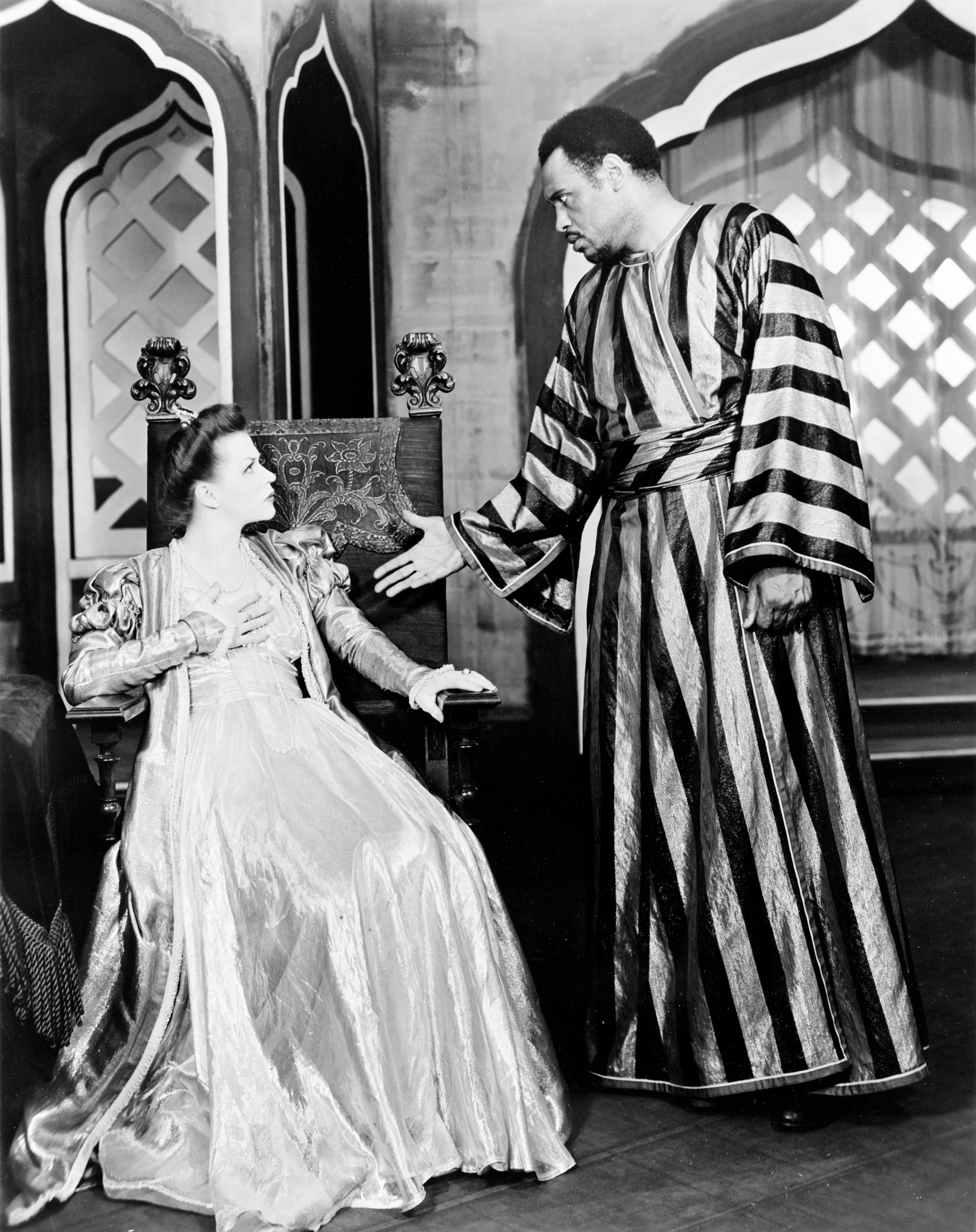
Robeson with Uta Hagen in the Theatre Guild production of Othello (1943–44)

Robeson participated in benefit concerts on behalf of the war effort. At a concert at the Polo Grounds, he met two emissaries from the Jewish Anti-Fascist Committee, Solomon Mikhoels and Itzik Feffer. Subsequently, Robeson reprised the role of Othello at the Shubert Theatre in 1943 and became the first African American to play the role with a white supporting cast on Broadway. The production was a success, running for 296 performances on Broadway (a record for a Shakespeare production on Broadway that still stands), and winning for Robeson the first Donaldson Award for Best Actor in a Play. During the same period, he addressed a meeting with Commissioner Kenesaw Mountain Landis and team owners in a failed attempt to convince them to admit black players to Major League Baseball. Robeson toured North America with Othello until 1945 and, subsequently, his political efforts with the Council on African Affairs to get colonial powers to discontinue their exploitation of Africa were short-circuited by the United Nations.

During this period, Robeson also developed sympathy for the Republic of China's side in the Second Sino-Japanese War. In 1940, the Chinese progressive activist, Liu Liangmo taught Robeson the patriotic song "Chee Lai!" ("Arise!"), known as the March of the Volunteers. Robeson premiered the song at a concert in New York City's Lewisohn Stadium and recorded it in both English and Chinese for Keynote Records in early 1941. Robeson gave further performances at benefit concerts for the China Aid Council and United China Relief at Washington's Uline Arena on April 24, 1941. The Washington Committee for Aid to China's booking of Constitution Hall had been blocked by the Daughters of the American Revolution because of Robeson's race. The indignation was so great that Eleanor Roosevelt and Hu Shih, the Chinese ambassador, became sponsors. However, when the organizers offered tickets on generous terms to the National Negro Congress to help fill the larger venue, both sponsors withdrew, objecting to the NNC's Communist ties.

Robeson opposed the U.S. support for Chiang Kai-shek and the Kuomintang in China, and he denounced U.S. support for Chiang at political events over the course of 1945–1946, including the Soviet-controlled World Peace Council and the National Peace Commission. In Robeson's view, the Kuomintang's anti-communist focus and blockade of the Communist guerrilla army meant that China was fighting Japan "with one hand tied behind its back".

March of the Volunteers (Chee lai!) became the newly founded People's Republic of China's National Anthem after 1949. Its Chinese lyricist, Tian Han, died in a Beijing prison in 1968, a victim of the Chinese Cultural Revolution, but Robeson continued to send royalties to his family.

=== 1946–1949: Attorney General's List of Subversive Organizations ===
After the Moore's Ford lynchings of four African Americans in Georgia on July 25, 1946, Robeson met with President Truman and admonished Truman by stating that if he did not enact legislation to end lynching, "the Negroes will defend themselves". Truman immediately terminated the meeting and declared that the time was not right to propose anti-lynching legislation. Subsequently, Robeson publicly called upon all Americans to demand that Congress pass civil rights legislation. Robeson founded the American Crusade Against Lynching organization in 1946. This organization was thought to be a threat to the NAACP antiviolence movement. Robeson received support from W. E. B. Du Bois on this matter and launched the organization on the anniversary of the signing of the Emancipation Proclamation, September 23.

About this time, Robeson's belief that trade unionism was crucial to civil rights became a mainstay of his political beliefs as he became a proponent of the union activist and Communist Party USA member Revels Cayton. Robeson was later called before the Tenney Committee where he responded to questions about his affiliation with the Communist Party USA by testifying that he was not a member of the party. Nevertheless, two organizations with which Robeson was intimately involved, the Civil Rights Congress and the Council on African Affairs, were placed on the Attorney General's List of Subversive Organizations. Subsequently, Robeson was summoned before the United States Senate Committee on the Judiciary, and when questioned about his affiliation with the Communist Party, he refused to answer, stating: "Some of the most brilliant and distinguished Americans are about to go to jail for the failure to answer that question, and I am going to join them, if necessary."

In 1948, Robeson was prominent in Henry A. Wallace's bid for the Presidency of the United States. Robeson traveled to the Deep South at risk to his own life to campaign for Wallace. In the ensuing year, Robeson was forced to go overseas to work because his U.S. concert performances were canceled at the FBI's behest. Visiting Trinidad, he laid the foundation stone for the Little Carib Theatre, formally opened in November 1948, whose founder Beryl McBurnie he had met in New York when she was studying drama there.

On April 20, 1949, Robeson spoke at the Paris Peace Congress saying: "We in America do not forget that it was on the backs of the white workers from Europe and on the backs of millions of Blacks that the wealth of America was built. And we are resolved to share it equally. We reject any hysterical raving that urges us to make war on anyone. Our will to fight for peace is strong. We shall not make war on anyone. We shall not make war on the Soviet Union. We oppose those who wish to build up imperialist Germany and to establish fascism in Greece. We wish peace with Franco's Spain despite her fascism. We shall support peace and friendship among all nations, with Soviet Russia and the people's Republics." He was blacklisted for saying this in the mainstream press within the United States, including in many periodicals of the Black press, including The Crisis. The Associated Press published a false transcript of his speech, giving the impression that Robeson had equated America with a Fascist state. In an interview, Robeson said the "danger of Fascism [in the U.S.] has averted". Nevertheless, the speech publicly attributed to him was a catalyst for his being seen as an enemy of mainstream America. While Robeson advocated in favor of twelve defendants, including his long-time friend Benjamin J. Davis Jr., charged during the Smith Act trials of Communist Party leaders, he publicly denounced a resolution in favor of including members of the Trotskyite Socialist Workers party who were also being prosecuted under the Smith Act, declaring them "allies of fascism" and "enemies of the working class".

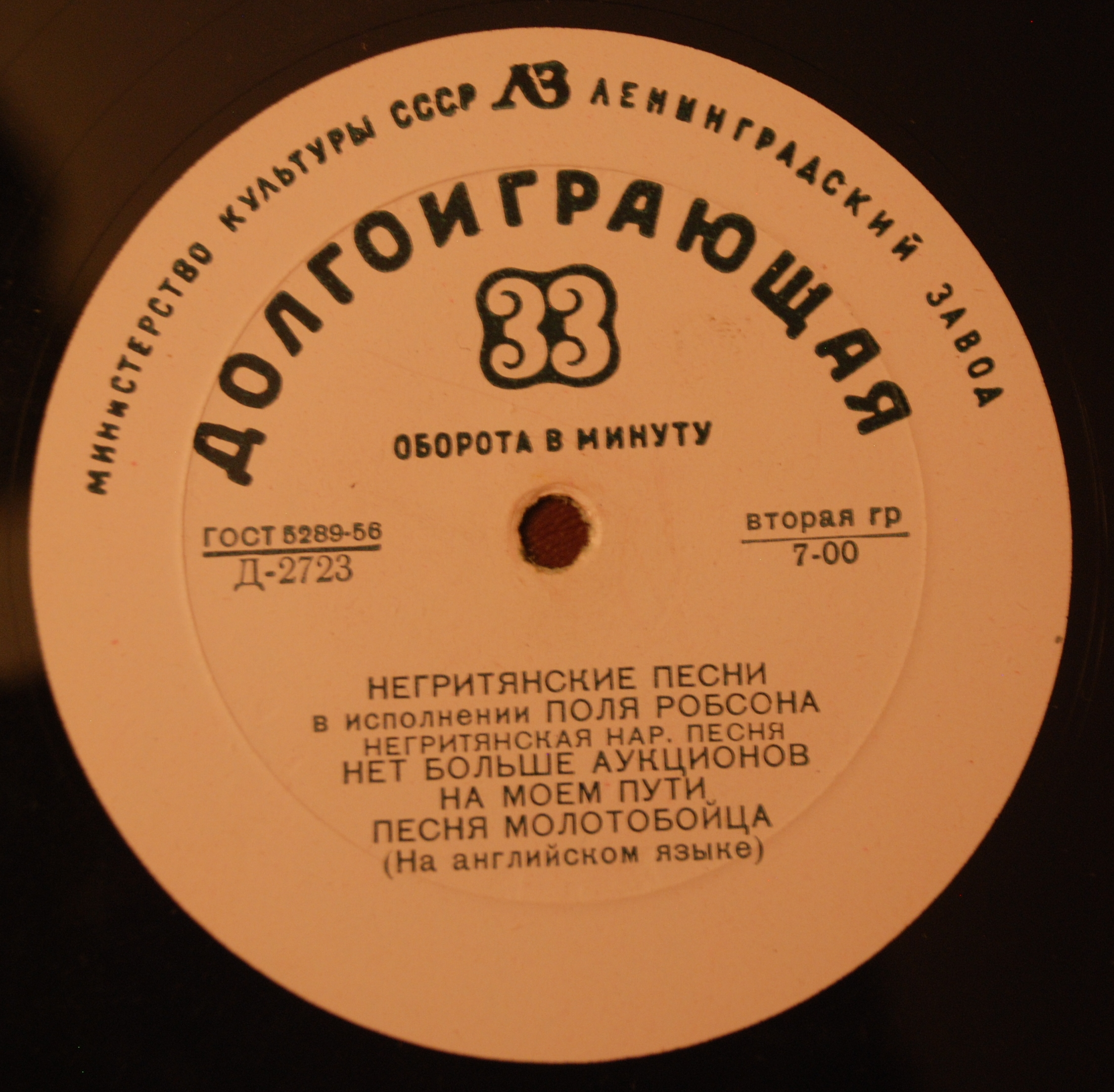
Label of a record by Robeson published by the Soviet Ministry of Culture

Robeson traveled to Moscow in June 1949 to seek Itzik Feffer, whom he had met during World War II. He let Soviet authorities know that he wanted to see Feffer. Reluctant to lose Robeson as a propagandist for the Soviet Union, the Soviets brought Feffer from prison to Robeson. Feffer told him that Mikhoels had been murdered, and predicted that he would be executed, which he was in Lubyanka Prison on August 12, 1952. To protect the Soviet Union's reputation, and to keep the right wing of the United States from gaining the moral high ground, Robeson denied that any persecution existed in the Soviet Union, keeping that meeting secret for the rest of his life, except from his son. Robeson's son would later recount that his father had explained to him how "sometimes great injustices may be inflicted on the minority when the majority is in the pursuit of a great and just cause".

To isolate Robeson politically, the House Un-American Activities Committee subpoenaed Jackie Robinson to comment on Robeson's Paris speech. Robinson testified that Robeson's statements, "'if accurately reported', were silly'". Former first lady Eleanor Roosevelt noted: "Mr. Robeson does his people great harm in trying to line them up on the Communist side of [the] political picture. Jackie Robinson helps them greatly by his forthright statements." Days later, the announcement of a concert headlined by Robeson in New York City provoked the local press to decry the use of their community to support "subversives". The Peekskill riots ensued, during which violent anti-Robeson protests shut down a Robeson concert on August 27, 1949 and marred the aftermath of the replacement concert held eight days later.

=== 1950–1955: Blacklisted ===
In its review of Christy Walsh's massive 1949 reference, College Football and All America Review, the Los Angeles Times praised it as "the most complete source of past gridiron scores, players, coaches, etc., yet published", but it failed to list Robeson as ever having played on the Rutgers team or ever having been an All-American. Months later, NBC canceled Robeson's appearance on Eleanor Roosevelt's television program, which furthered his erasure from public view.

Robeson opposed U.S. involvement in the Korean War and condemned America's nuclear threats against China. In Robeson's opinion, the U.S. had manipulated the United Nations for imperialist purposes, and China's intervention in the Korean War was necessary to defend the security of millions of people in Asia. Robeson credited "American peace sentiment" as a crucial factor in President Truman not using nuclear weapons and in recalling General Douglas MacArthur.

A month after Robeson began criticizing his country's role in the Korean War, the Department of State demanded that he return his passport. Robeson refused. At the FBI's request, the State Department voided Robeson's passport and instructed customs officials to prevent any attempt by him to leave the country. Confining him inside the U.S. afforded him less freedom to express what some saw as his "extreme advocacy on behalf of the independence of the colonial peoples of Africa". It is estimated that the revocation of Robeson's travel privileges, and the resulting inability to earn fees overseas, caused his yearly income to drop from $150,000 (equivalent to $2,000,000 in 2025) to less than $3,000 (equivalent to $40,000 in 2025). When Robeson met with State Department officials and asked why he was denied a passport, he was told that "his frequent criticism of the treatment of blacks in the United States should not be aired in foreign countries".

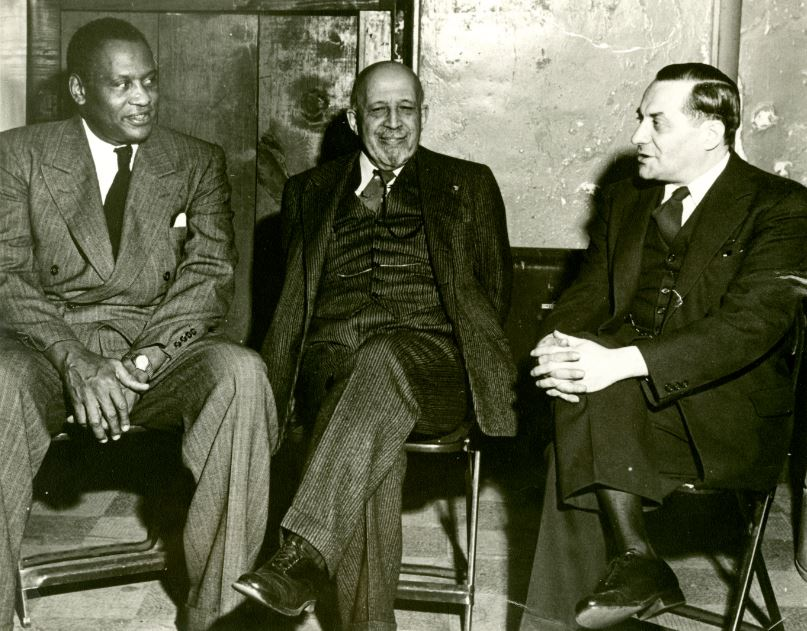
Robeson (left) with W. E. B. Du Bois (center) and Vito Marcantonio, 1951

Robeson delivered the plenary address at the National Labor Conference for Negro Rights held in Chicago in June 1950.

In 1950, he co-founded, with W. E. B. Du Bois, a monthly newspaper, Freedom, showcasing his views and those of his circle. Most issues had a column by Robeson, on the front page. In the final issue, July–August 1955, an unsigned column on the front page of the newspaper described the struggle for the restoration of his passport. It called for support from the leading African-American organizations, and asserted that "Negroes, [and] all Americans who have breathed a sigh of relief at the easing of international tensions... have a stake in the Paul Robeson passport case". An article by Robeson appeared on the second page continuing the passport issue under the headline: "If Enough People Write Washington I'll Get My Passport in a Hurry."

In 1951, an article titled "Paul Robeson – the Lost Shepherd" was published in The Crisis and attributed to Robert Alan, although Paul Jr. suspected it was written by Amsterdam News columnist Earl Brown. J. Edgar Hoover and the U.S. State Department arranged for the article to be printed and distributed in Africa in order to damage Robeson's reputation and reduce his popularity, and Communism's popularity, in colonial countries. Another article by Roy Wilkins (now thought to have been the real author of "Paul Robeson – the Lost Shepherd") denounced Robeson as well as the CPUSA in terms consistent with the FBI's anti-Communist propaganda of the era.

In December 1951, Robeson, in New York City, and William L. Patterson, in Paris, presented the United Nations with a Civil Rights Congress petition titled We Charge Genocide. The document asserted that the United States federal government, by its failure to act against lynching in the United States, was guilty of genocide under Article II of the UN Genocide Convention. The petition was not officially acknowledged by the UN, and, though receiving some favorable reception in Europe and in America's Black press, was largely either ignored or criticized for its association with Communism in America's mainstream press.

In 1952, Robeson was awarded the International Stalin Prize by the Soviet Union. Unable to travel to Moscow, he accepted the award in New York. In April 1953, shortly after Stalin's death, Robeson penned "To You My Beloved Comrade", praising Stalin as dedicated to peace and a guide to the world: "Through his deep humanity, by his wise understanding, he leaves us a rich and monumental heritage." Robeson's opinions about the Soviet Union kept his passport out of reach and stopped his return to the entertainment industry and the civil rights movement. In his opinion, the Soviet Union was the guarantor of political balance in the world.

In a symbolic act of defiance against the travel ban, in May 1952, labor unions in the United States and Canada organized a concert at the International Peace Arch on the border between Washington State and the Canadian province of British Columbia. Robeson returned to perform a second concert at the Peace Arch in 1953, and over the next two years, two further concerts took place. In this period, with the encouragement of his friend the Welsh politician Aneurin Bevan, Robeson recorded a number of radio concerts for supporters in Wales.

=== 1956–1957: End of McCarthyism ===
On June 12, 1956, Robeson was called before the House Un-American Activities Committee after he refused to sign an affidavit affirming he was not a Communist. He attempted to read his prepared statement into the Congressional Record, but the Committee denied him that opportunity. During questioning, he invoked the Fifth Amendment and declined to reveal his political affiliations. When asked why he had not remained in the Soviet Union, given his affinity for its political ideology, he replied: "because my father was a slave and my people died to build [the United States and], I am going to stay here, and have a part of it just like you, and no fascist-minded people will drive me from it!" At that hearing, Robeson stated: "Whether I am or not a Communist is irrelevant. The question is whether American citizens, regardless of their political beliefs or sympathies, may enjoy their constitutional rights."

In retaliation for Robeson's political views, his recordings and films were removed from public distribution, and he was universally condemned in the U.S. press. During the height of the Cold War, it became increasingly difficult in the United States to hear Robeson sing on commercial radio, buy his music, or see his films.

In 1956, in the United Kingdom, Topic Records, at that time part of the Workers Music Association, released a single of Robeson singing the labor anthem "Joe Hill", written by Alfred Hayes and Earl Robinson, backed with "John Brown's Body". In 1956, after public pressure brought a one-time exemption to the travel ban, Robeson performed two concerts in Canada in February, one in Toronto and the other at a union convention in Sudbury, Ontario.

Still unable to perform abroad in person, on May 26, 1957, Robeson sang for a London audience at St. Pancras Town Hall (where the 1,000 available concert tickets for "Let Robeson Sing" sold out within an hour) via the recently completed transatlantic telephone cable TAT-1. In October of that year, using the same technology, Robeson sang to an audience of "perhaps 5,000" at Porthcawl's Grand Pavilion in Wales.

Nikita Khrushchev's denunciation of Stalinism at the 1956 Party Congress silenced Robeson on Stalin, although Robeson continued to praise the Soviet Union. That year Robeson, along with close friend W.E.B. Du Bois, compared the anti-Soviet uprising in Hungary to the "same sort of people who overthrew the Spanish Republican Government" and supported the Soviet invasion and suppression of the revolt.

Robeson's passport was finally restored in 1958 as a result of the U.S. Supreme Court's 5 to 4 decision in Kent v. Dulles, in which the majority ruled that the denial of a passport without due process amounted to a violation of constitutionally protected liberty under the Fifth Amendment.

== Later life ==
=== Here I Stand ===
While still confined in the U.S., Robeson finished his defiant "manifesto-autobiography" Here I Stand, published on February 14, 1958. John Vernon noted in Negro History Bulletin that "few publications dared or cared to review it—as if he had no longer existed". In a preface to the 1971 edition, Robeson's friend and collaborator Lloyd L. Brown wrote that "no white commercial newspaper or magazine in the entire country so much as mentioned Robeson's book. Leading papers in the field of literary coverage, including The New York Times and the Herald-Tribune, not only did not review it, they refused even to include its name in their lists of 'books out today'." Brown added that the boycott was not in effect in foreign countries; for example, Here I Stand was favorably reviewed in England, Japan, and India. The book also received prompt attention from the African-American press. The Baltimore Afro-American was the first to champion the merits of Robeson's autobiography. The Pittsburgh Courier, Chicago Crusader, and the Los Angeles Herald-Dispatch soon followed suit. The NAACP's magazine, The Crisis, was more critical in its appraisal.

=== 1958–1960: Comeback tours ===
==== Europe ====
After Robeson's passport was returned in June 1958, he immediately left the U.S. for Europe. He embarked on a world tour using London as his base. He gave 28 performances in towns and cities throughout Great Britain. In April 1959, he starred in Tony Richardson's production of Othello at Stratford-upon-Avon. In Moscow in August 1959, he received a tumultuous reception at the Luzhniki Stadium where he sang classic Russian songs along with American standards. Robeson and Essie then flew to Yalta to rest and spend time with Nikita Khrushchev.

On October 11, 1958, Robeson took part in a service at London's St Paul's Cathedral, the first black performer to sing there.

On a trip to Moscow, Robeson experienced bouts of dizziness and heart problems, and he was hospitalized for two months while Essie was diagnosed with operable cancer. He recovered and returned to Great Britain to visit the National Eisteddfod of Wales.

In 1960, during his final concert performance in Great Britain, Robeson sang to raise money for the Movement for Colonial Freedom at the Royal Festival Hall.

==== Australia and New Zealand ====
In October 1960, Robeson embarked on a two-month concert tour of Australia and New Zealand with Essie, primarily to generate money, at the behest of Australian politician Bill Morrow. While in Sydney, Robeson became the first major artist to perform at the construction site of the future Sydney Opera House. After appearing at the Brisbane Festival Hall, the couple went to Auckland, where Robeson reaffirmed his support of Marxism-Leninism, and denounced the inequality faced by the Māori and efforts to denigrate their culture. Thereabouts, Robeson publicly stated "... the people of the lands of Socialism want peace dearly".

During the tour, Robeson was introduced to Faith Bandler and other activists who aroused the couple's concern for the plight of the Aboriginal Australians. Robeson subsequently demanded that the Australian government provide them with full citizenship and equal rights. He attacked the view that they were unsophisticated and uncultured, and he declared that "there's no such thing as a backward human being, there is only a society which says they are backward."

Robeson left Australia as a respected, albeit controversial, figure. His support for Aboriginal rights had a profound effect in Australia during the next decade.

=== 1961–1963: Health breakdown ===
Back in London after his Australia and New Zealand tour, Robeson expressed a desire to return to the United States and participate in the civil rights movement, while his wife argued that he would be unsafe there and "unable to make any money" due to government harassment. In March 1961, Robeson again traveled to Moscow.

==== Moscow breakdown ====
During an uncharacteristically wild party in his Moscow hotel room, Robeson locked himself in his bedroom and attempted suicide by cutting his wrists. Three days later, under Soviet medical care, he told his son, who had received news about his condition and traveled to Moscow, that he felt extreme paranoia, he thought that the walls of the room were moving and, overcome by a powerful sense of emptiness and depression, he tried to take his own life.

Robeson's son believed that his father's health problems stemmed from the CIA's and MI5's attempts to "neutralize" his father, claiming his doctors in New York were CIA contractors involved in MK-ULTRA. Martin Duberman wrote that Robeson's health breakdown was probably brought on by a combination of factors including extreme emotional and physical stress, bipolar depression, exhaustion, and the beginning of circulatory and heart problems. "[E]ven without an organic predisposition and accumulated pressures of government harassment he might have been susceptible to a breakdown."

==== Repeated deterioration in London ====
Robeson stayed at the Barvikha Sanatorium until September 1961, when he left for London. There his depression reemerged, and after another period of recuperation in Moscow, he returned to London.

Three days after arriving back, he became suicidal and suffered a panic attack while passing the Soviet Embassy. He was admitted to the Priory Hospital, where he underwent electroconvulsive therapy (ECT) and was given heavy doses of drugs for nearly two years, with no accompanying psychotherapy. During his treatment at the Priory, Robeson was being monitored by the British MI5.

Both British and American intelligence services were well aware of Robeson's suicidal state of mind: An FBI memo described Robeson's debilitated condition, remarking that his "death would be much publicized" and would be used for Communist propaganda, necessitating continued surveillance. Numerous memos advised that Robeson should be denied a passport renewal, an obstacle that was likely to further jeopardize his recovery process.

==== Treatment in East Germany ====
In August 1963, disturbed about his treatment, friends and family had Robeson transferred to the Buch Clinic in East Berlin. Given psychotherapy and less medication, his physicians found him still "completely without initiative" and they expressed "doubt and anger" about the "high level of barbiturates and ECT" that had been administered in London. He rapidly improved, though his doctor stressed that "what little is left of Paul's health must be quietly conserved."

=== 1963–1976: Retirement ===
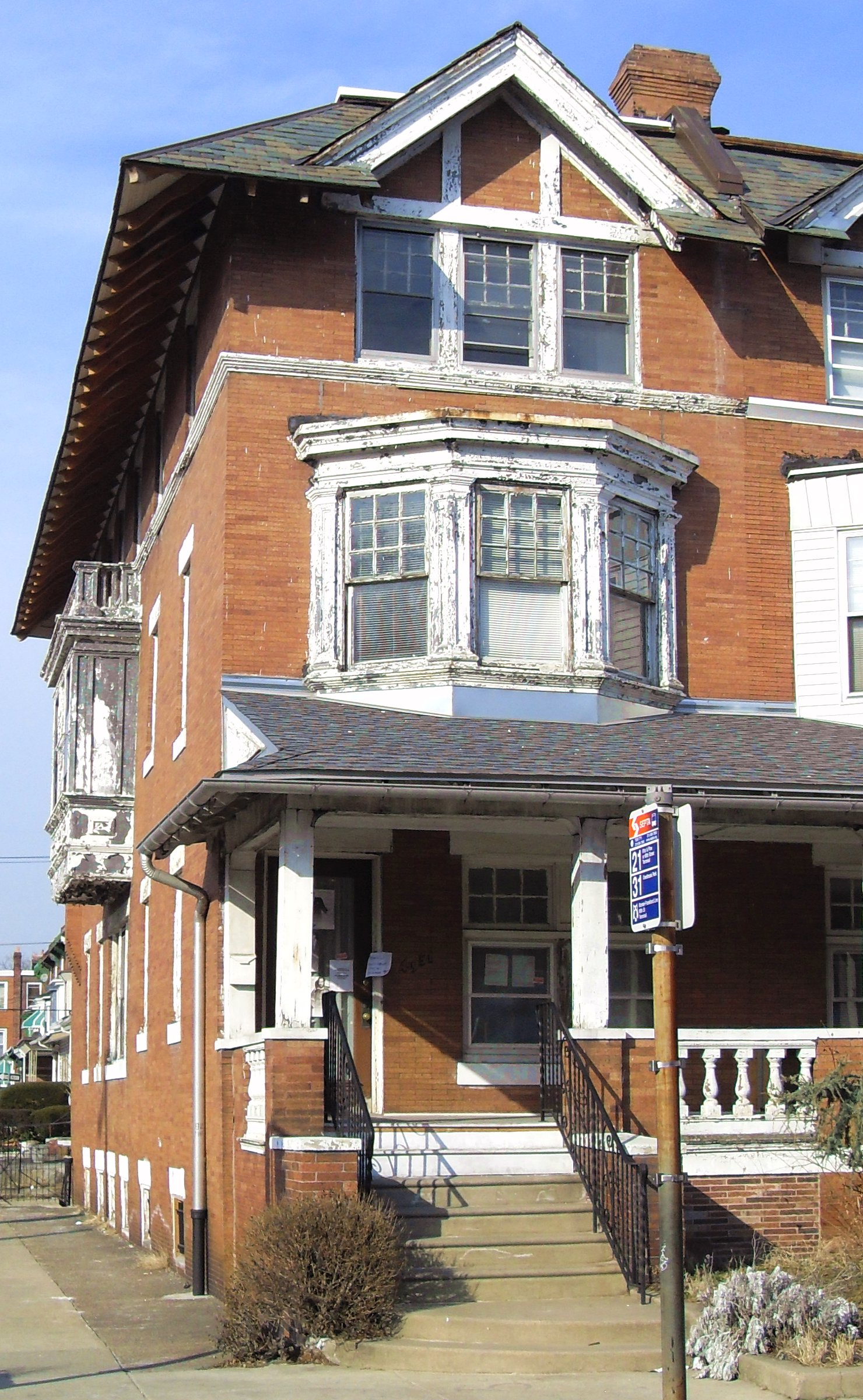
The Paul Robeson House in Philadelphia (2009)

In December 1963, Robeson returned to the United States and for the remainder of his life lived mainly in seclusion. He briefly assumed a role in the Civil Rights Movement, making a few major public appearances before falling seriously ill during a tour. In 1965, he was hospitalized with double pneumonia and a kidney blockage that nearly killed him.

==== Invitations to become involved in the civil rights movement ====
Robeson was contacted by Bayard Rustin and James Farmer, who asked him about the possibility of becoming involved in the mainstream of the Civil Rights Movement. Because of Rustin's past anti-Communist stances, Robeson declined to meet with him. Robeson eventually met with Farmer, but because he was asked to denounce Communism and the Soviet Union in order to assume a place in the mainstream, Robeson adamantly declined.

==== Final years ====
Essie, who had been her husband's media spokesperson, died in December 1965, after which Robeson moved to New York City to live with his son and his family. He was rarely seen strolling near his Harlem apartment on Jumel Place, and his son responded to press inquiries that his "father's health does not permit him to perform, or answer questions." In 1968, Robeson moved to his sister's home in Philadelphia.

Over the following years, numerous celebrations were held in honor of Robeson, several of them in venues that had previously shunned him. He saw few visitors except for his closest friends. He gave few public statements apart from messages to support civil rights and international movements, feeling that his record "spoke for itself".

Robeson was unable to attend a 75th birthday tribute at Carnegie Hall in 1973, but he recorded a message that was played at the event: "Though I have not been able to be active for several years, I want you to know that I am the same Paul, dedicated as ever to the worldwide cause of humanity for freedom, peace and brotherhood."

=== 1976: Death, funeral, and public response ===
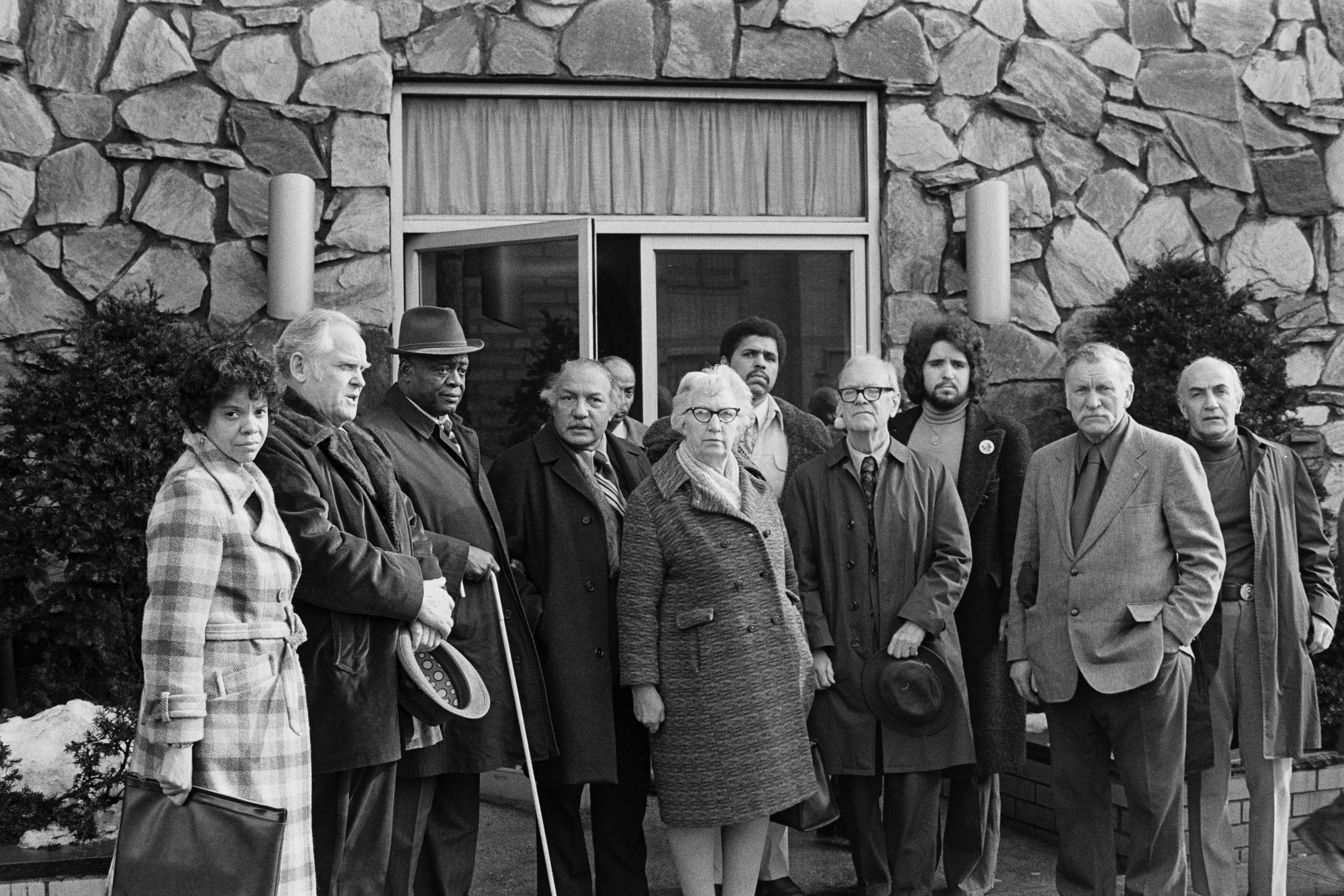
Communist Party USA leaders at Robeson's wake, January 25, 1976 (L-R): Alva Buxenbaum, Gus Hall, Henry Winston, James E. Jackson, Helen Winter, Carl Bloice, Arnold Johnson.

On January 23, 1976, Robeson died in Philadelphia at the age of 77, following complications of a stroke. He lay in state in Harlem and his funeral was held at his brother Ben's former parish, Mother Zion AME Zion Church, where Bishop J. Clinton Hoggard performed the eulogy. His 12 pall bearers included Harry Belafonte and Fritz Pollard. He was interred in the Ferncliff Cemetery in Hartsdale, New York.

Biographer Martin Duberman said of news media notices upon Robeson's death:

the "white [American] press ... ignored the continuing inability of white America to tolerate a black maverick who refused to bend, ... downplayed the racist component central to his persecution" [during his life, as they] "gingerly" [paid him] "respect and tipped their hat to him as a 'great American'," while the black American press, "which had never, overall, been as hostile to Robeson" [as the white American press had,] opined that his life "'... would always be a challenge to white and Black America.'"

== Legacy and honors ==
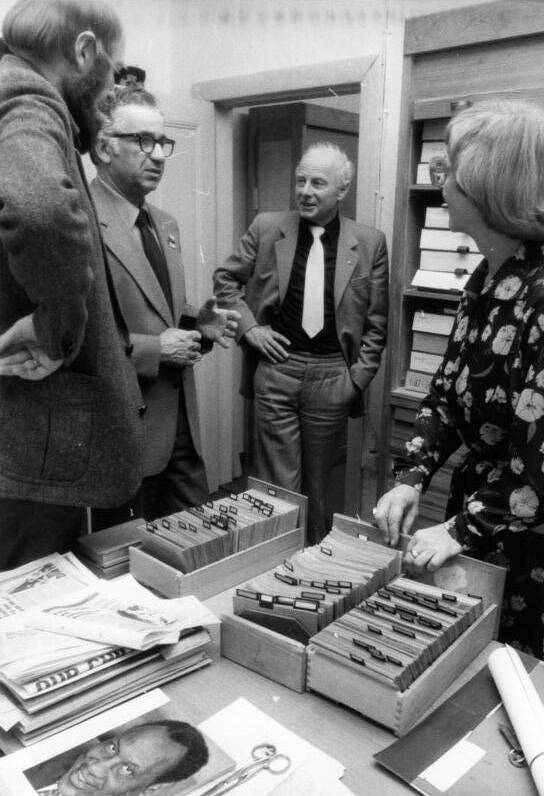
The Robeson holdings in the archive of the Academy of the Arts of the German Democratic Republic, 1981

Early in his life, Robeson was one of the most influential participants in the Harlem Renaissance. His achievements in sport and culture were all the more impressive given the barriers of racism he had to surmount. Robeson brought Negro spirituals into the American mainstream. He was among the first artists to refuse to perform to segregated audiences. Historian Penny Von Eschen wrote that while McCarthyism curbed American anti-colonialist politics in the 1940s such as Robeson's, "the [African independence movements] of the late 1950s and 1960s would vindicate his anti-colonial [agenda]."

In 1945, he received the Spingarn Medal from the NAACP. Several public and private establishments he was associated with have been landmarked, or named after him.

In 1950, Robeson was awarded the International Peace Prize for his Songs of Peace.

His efforts to end apartheid in South Africa were posthumously rewarded in 1978 by the United Nations General Assembly. Paul Robeson: Tribute to an Artist won an Academy Award for Best Short Documentary in 1980. In 1995, he was named to the College Football Hall of Fame. In the centenary of his birth, which was commemorated around the world, he was awarded a Lifetime Achievement Grammy Award, as well as a star on the Hollywood Walk of Fame. Robeson is also a member of the American Theater Hall of Fame.

As of 2011, the run of Othello starring Robeson was the longest-running production of a Shakespeare play ever staged on Broadway. He received a Donaldson Award for his performance. His Othello was characterised by Michael A. Morrison in 2011 as a high point in Shakespearean theatre in the 20th century. In 1930, while performing Othello in London, Robeson was painted by the British artist Glyn Philpot; this portrait was sold in 1944 under the title Head of a Negro and thereafter thought lost, but was rediscovered by Simon Martin, the director of the Pallant House Gallery, for an exhibition held there in 2022.

Robeson archives exist at the Academy of Arts; Howard University, and the Schomburg Center for Research in Black Culture. In 2010, Susan Robeson launched a project at Swansea University, supported the Welsh Assembly, to create an online learning resource in her grandfather's memory.

In 1976, the apartment building on Edgecombe Avenue in the Washington Heights section of Manhattan where Robeson lived during the early 1940s was officially renamed the Paul Robeson Residence, and declared a National Historic Landmark. In 1993, the building was designated a New York City landmark as well. Edgecombe Avenue itself was later co-named Paul Robeson Boulevard.

In 1978, the Telegraph Agency of the Soviet Union announced that the Latvian Shipping Company had named one of its new 40,000-ton tankers Paul Robeson in honor of the singer. The agency said the ship's crew established a Robeson museum aboard the tanker. After Robeson's death, a street in the Prenzlauer Berg district of East Berlin was renamed Paul-Robeson-Straße, and the street name remains in reunified Berlin. An East German stamp featuring Robeson's face was issued with the text "For Peace Against Racism, Paul Robeson 1898–1976."

In 1991, the Pennsylvania Historical and Museum Commission declared Robeson's sister Marian's house where he spent his last years, or Paul Robeson's House, a historical landmark.

In 2001, (Here I Stand) In the Spirit of Paul Robeson, a public artwork by American artist Allen Uzikee Nelson, was dedicated in the Petworth neighborhood in Washington, D.C.

In 2002, a blue plaque was unveiled by English Heritage on the house in Branch Hill, Hampstead, where Robeson lived in 1929–30. On May 18, 2002, a memorial concert celebrating the 50th anniversary of Robeson's concert across the Canadian border took place on the same spot at Peace Park in Vancouver.

In 2004, the U.S. Postal Service issued a 37-cent stamp honoring Robeson. In 2006, a plaque was unveiled in his honor at the University of London's School of Oriental and African Studies. In 2007, the Criterion Collection, a company that specializes in releasing special-edition versions of classic and contemporary films, released a DVD boxed set of Robeson films. In 2009, Robeson was inducted into the New Jersey Hall of Fame.

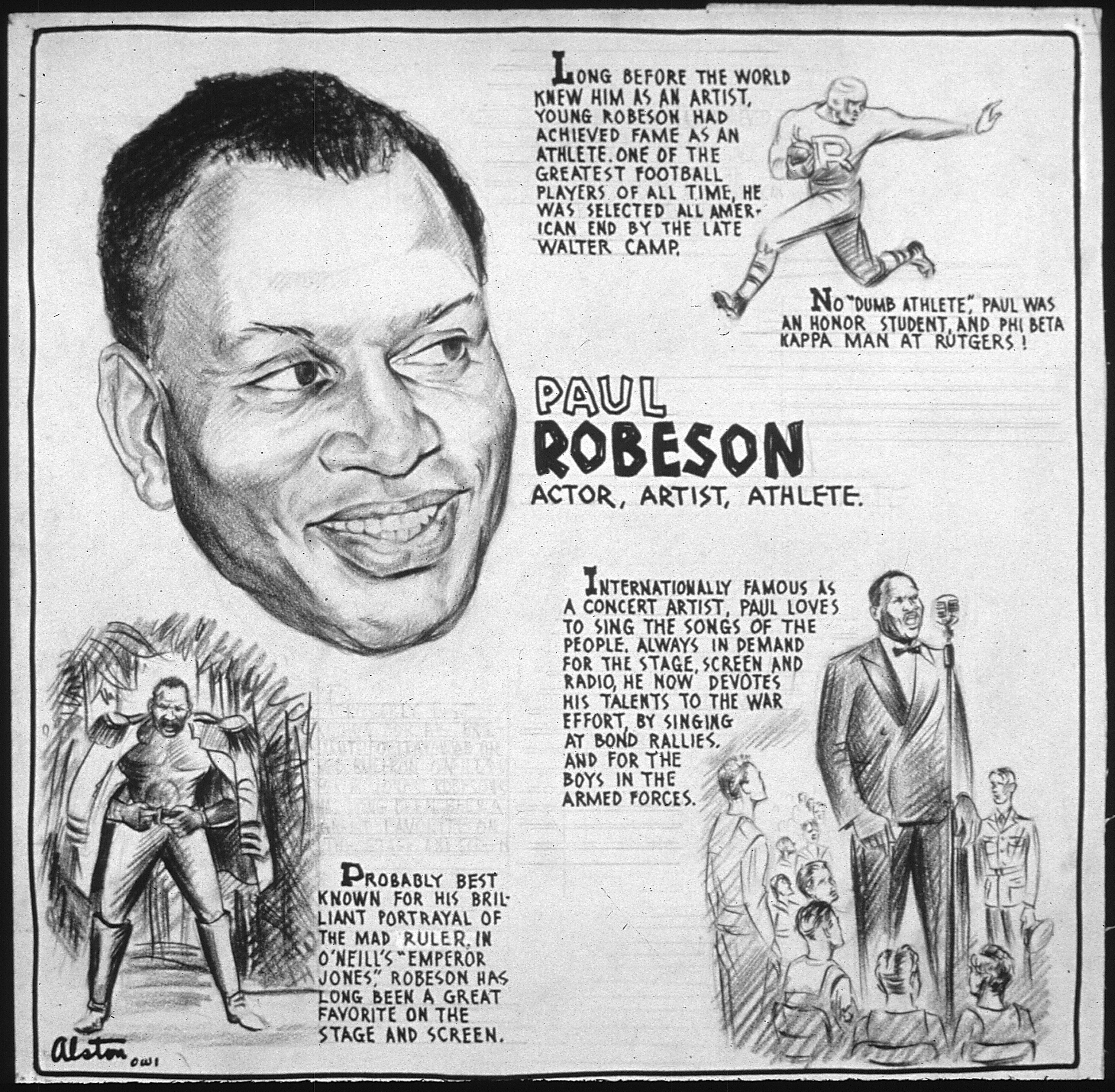
Illustration of Paul Robeson by Charles Henry Alston

The main campus library at Rutgers University–Camden is named after Robeson, as is the campus center at Rutgers University–Newark. The Paul Robeson Cultural Center is on the campus of Rutgers University-New Brunswick. In 1969, North Carolina A&T State University built the Paul Robeson Theatre in his honor.

In 1972, Penn State established a formal cultural center on the University Park campus. Students and staff chose to name the center for Robeson. A street in Princeton, New Jersey, is named after him. In addition, the block of Davenport Street in Somerville, New Jersey, where St. Thomas AME Zion Church still stands, is called Paul Robeson Boulevard. In West Philadelphia, the Paul Robeson High School is named after him. To celebrate the 100th anniversary of Robeson's graduation, Rutgers University named an open-air plaza after him on Friday, April 12, 2019. The plaza, next to the Voorhees Mall on the College Avenue campus at Rutgers, New Brunswick, features eight black granite panels with details of Robeson's life.

On March 6, 2019, the city council of New Brunswick, New Jersey, approved the renaming of Commercial Avenue to Paul Robeson Boulevard.

A dark red heirloom tomato from the Soviet Union was given the name Paul Robeson.

=== In popular culture ===
In 1949, some Chinese editors published children's cartoons presenting him as an artistic and revolutionary hero. In contemporary China, Robeson continues to be praised for his art and as a friend to China, including for his role in globalizing the March of the Volunteers.

In 1954, the Kurdish poet Abdulla Goran wrote the poem Bangêk bo Pol Ropsin ("A Call for Paul Robeson"). In the same year, another Kurdish poet, Cegerxwîn, also wrote a poem about him, Heval Pol Robson ("Comrade Paul Robeson"), which was put to music by singer Şivan Perwer in 1976. In 1970, American poet Gwendolyn Brooks published a poem entitled Paul Robeson.

Rock band Black 47's 1994 album Home of the Brave includes the song "Paul Robeson (Born to Be Free)", which features spoken quotes of Robeson as part of the song. These quotes are drawn from Robeson's testimony before the House Un-American Activities Committee in June 1956.

In 2001, Welsh rock band Manic Street Preachers released a song titled "Let Robeson Sing" as a tribute to Robeson, which reached number 19 on the UK Singles Chart.

In January 1978, James Earl Jones performed the one-man show Paul Robeson, written by Phillip Hayes Dean, on Broadway. This stage drama was made into a TV movie in 1979, starring Jones and directed by Lloyd Richards.

At the 2007 Edinburgh Festival Fringe, British-Nigerian actor Tayo Aluko, himself a baritone soloist, premiered his one-man show, Call Mr. Robeson: A Life with Songs, which has since toured various countries.

A fictional Paul Robeson appears in The Young Indiana Jones Chronicles episode "Winds of Change" as a friend of Indiana Jones.

World Inferno Friendship Society had a semi-biographical song about Paul Robeson's life on their 2006 album Red Eyed Soul.

Tom Rob Smith's novel Agent 6 (2012) includes the character Jesse Austin, "a black singer, political activist and communist sympathizer modeled after real-life actor/activist Paul Robeson." Robeson also appears in short fiction published in the online literary magazines the Maple Tree Literary Supplement and Every Day Fiction.

Film director Steve McQueen's video work End Credits (2012–ongoing), shown at the Whitney Museum of American Art, the Tate Modern, the Art Institute of Chicago, and the Pérez Art Museum Miami, reproduces Robeson's declassified, although still heavily redacted, FBI files.

On September 7, 2019, Crossroads Theatre Company performed Phillip Hayes Dean's play Paul Robeson in the inaugural performance of the New Brunswick Performing Arts Center.

Robeson was widely popular among Indian intellectuals and artists. Noted Indian singer-songwriter, Dr. Bhupen Hazarika met Robeson in 1949, befriended him and participated in civil rights activities. Hazarika based his iconic Assamese song "Bistirno Parore" ("Of the wide shores") on Robeson's "Ol' Man River", later translated into Bengali, Hindi, Nepali, and Sanskrit. Singer-songwriter Hemanga Biswas sang the Bengali ballad "Negro bhai amar Paul Robeson" ("Our Negro brother Paul Robeson"). There were nation-wide celebrations in India on Robeson's 60th birthday in 1958, with the then prime minister Jawaharlal Nehru saying: "This occasion deserves celebration...because Paul Robeson is one of the greatest artistes of our generation."

A jazz poetry opera, Paul Robeson: Man of the People by Lasana Katembe and Ernest Dawkins, debuted at The Cabaret in Indianapolis, Indiana, on May 31, 2024, and was to have its Chicago premiere on June 7, 2024.

The Kurdish poet Cigerxwîn published a poem entitled Heval Pol Robson (Comrade Paul Robeson) in his 1954 collection, Sewra Azadî (Revolution of Freedom). The poem was later turned in to the song Ey Heval Pol Robson (Oh, Comrade Paul Robeson) by Şivan Perwer released in the year of Robeson's death,1976.

== Filmography ==
- Body and Soul (1925)
- Camille (1926)
- Borderline (1930)
- The Emperor Jones (1933)
- Sanders of the River (1935)
- Show Boat (1936)
- Song of Freedom (1936)
- Big Fella (1937)
- My Song Goes Forth (1937)
- King Solomon's Mines (1937)
- Jericho/Dark Sands (1937)
- The Proud Valley (1940)
- Native Land (1942)
- Tales of Manhattan (1942)
- We've Come a Long, Long Way (1944)
- The Song of the Rivers (1954)
- Paul Robeson: "I'm a Negro. I'm an American." (1989)

== Discography ==
Paul Robeson had an extensive recording career; discogs.com lists some 66 albums and 195 singles.

Selected albums

- Songs of Free Men (1943)
- Spirituals (1946)
- Swing Low, Sweet Chariot (1949)
- Paul Robeson: Favorite Songs (1959)
- Paul Robeson at Carnegie Hall (1959)
- "Encore, Robeson!" (Paul Robeson: Favorite Songs, Vol. 2) (1960)

== See also ==
- Freedom, American newspaper
- List of peace activists
- List of people from Harlem
