= Lawrence Benjamin Brown =

American composer, arranger and pianist

- Born: August 29, 1893; Jacksonville, Florida
- Died: December 25, 1972 (aged 79)
- Occupations: Arranger; accompanist, singer
- Instrument: Piano
- Years active: 1924–1963

Lawrence Benjamin Brown (August 29, 1893 – December 25, 1972) was an American singer, composer and pianist born in Jacksonville, Florida. He is best known for his arrangements of Negro spirituals, many of which he performed as accompanist for Paul Robeson, performing on piano and singing harmony.

== Early life ==
Lawrence was raised by his father, Clark Benjamin Brown, and his stepmother, Cenia Brown. Lawrence's birth mother died when he was three years old. Clark and his father were formerly enslaved.

== Education and early career ==
Brown's first music teacher was William Riddick, and was sent to study his principal instrument, piano, in Boston, Massachusetts. He worked as an elevator operator to make up for the costs his scholarships did not cover. He made his debut as a concert accompanist for tenor Sydney Woodward, and was later discovered by tenor Roland Hayes, with whom he toured from 1918 to 1923, including a performance at Buckingham Palace in 1921. While in England, he attended Trinity College for advanced training, where he received education in composition from Amanda Aldridge. In addition to piano and vocal arrangements, he performed string arrangements with cellist Beatrice Harrison at Wigmore Hall.

== Folk songs and spirituals ==
Following the publication of some of his arrangements of Negro spirituals in James Weldon Johnson's Book of American Negro Spirituals, Brown published his own Negro Folk Songs in 1930. His arrangements were performed by Paul Robeson in concert in 1925 at the Greenwich Village Theatre, and he continued a professional relationship and friendship with Robeson for the next 40 years accompanying each other in tours of Show Boat, with Brown harmonizing with his tenor voice. They toured internationally, including in Paris, London, Ireland, for the King of Spain and the Prince of Wales.

== Recordings with Paul Robeson ==
Robeson and Brown recorded many of Brown's arrangements on RCA Victor Records, including "Nobody Knows the Trouble I've Seen", "Sometimes I Feel Like a Motherless Child", and "Joe Hill". "Ballad for Americans" was an international success for the team. The two toured together with the USO during World War II. Brown did significant research for Robeson's projects, and actively sought folk music from around the world. He was frequently contacted by conductors seeking obscure folk music. He also had relationships with writers Lloyd Louis Brown and Langston Hughes. His friendship with Robeson and his wife, Eslanda ("Essie") Cardozo Goode Robeson, was challenged when Paul was blacklisted. Brown retired in 1963 after Robeson's career ended.

== Personal life ==
Brown never married, and lived in Harlem for the last 47 years of his life. Saint Martin's Episcopal Church in Harlem honored Brown with a memorial concert in February 1973.

In his 2017 book, Fighting Proud, in the chapter dedicated to Ken Johnson, historian Stephen Bourne lists Brown as one of the many jazz musicians, whose homosexuality "has not been fully acknowledged."
