= St Mary's Town and Country School =

School in London, United Kingdom

Coordinates: 51°32′41.5″N 0°10′8″W

St. Mary's Town and Country School was an independent, non-denominational, co-educational progressive day and boarding school, founded in Belsize Park, London in 1937. It closed at the end of 1982.

The school was owned and run by Mrs Elisabeth Paul PhD (née Selver), assisted by her husband Henry Paul, Elisabeth Paul's father David was a former rabbi in Darmstadt, Heinz Paul was a German Protestant. Both emigrated in 1936 from Berlin to London where in 1937 they bought the school, originally called St. Mary's School, at 1 Belsize Avenue. The school curriculum was biased toward the learning of languages and the arts from an early age, and the pupils, aged 4 to 18 years, were primarily the children of artists, musicians, writers, film producers and actors.

St. Mary's Town & Country School logo as a woven badge

== History ==
=== Pre-war ===
The school, as St. Mary's School, was run by Mrs A. Geary from 1932 at 1 Belsize Avenue until taken over by Mrs Paul.

=== Wartime ===
At the onset of the war the school moved a short distance to 16 Wedderburn Road, where Mrs Paul and Mrs Ena Curry (of Dartington Hall School) were joint principals, but soon the school was evacuated to a house on the south Devon coast at Beesands. Many of the pupils then were from Jewish refugee families who had escaped from Germany.

When France surrendered, with the threat of a German invasion, the school was moved inland to Yarkhill Court near Hereford, and stayed there until the end of the war. Yarkhill Court was a small Victorian manor house attached to a working mixed farm, and next to the river Frome. Accommodation was on three floors, but there was only one bathroom. Pupils could volunteer to cultivate the kitchen garden, they could go hop-picking, and there were pottery classes. The barn was used to stage school plays in French and German. Pupils were allowed to camp "wild" on the local common at half-term weekends. Mr Paul, in London, joined the Home Guard.

=== Post-war ===
After the war was the most successful period for the school: in 1946 the day school restarted at two large houses at 38-40 Eton Avenue.

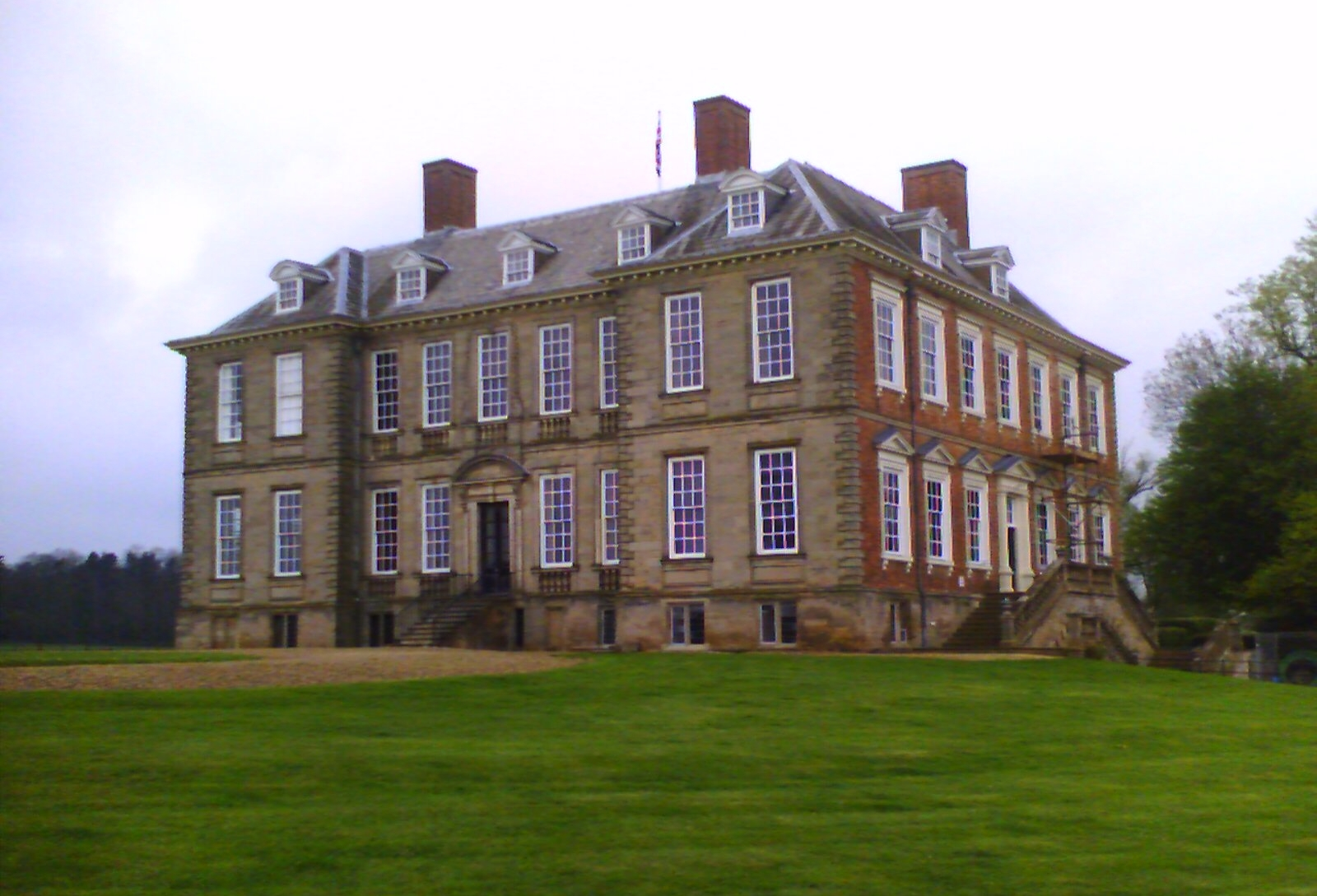
Stanford Hall

The next year the country branch moved to Stanford Hall near Rugby, with Mr. and Mrs. Paul as principals. In this period academic teaching became more rigorous, with more science subjects being introduced; advantage was taken of the large picturesque grounds, and there were more sports: horse-riding, tennis, football and athletics were introduced; advantage was taken of the large ballroom to provide facilities for music and dancing. The two schools were run in close conjunction, with exchanges of pupils and staff. In 1949 the school left Stanford Hall, which was in serious need of repair, but continued at Eton Avenue when it was still called St. Mary's Town and Country School. Mrs Paul's residence and a boarding house was established at 87 Belsize Park Gardens.

In 1954 Hedgerley Wood was acquired, a woodland property of 16 acres (65,000 m^{2}), near Chinnor in the Chilterns, with a small swimming-pool and all facilities for games and projects. This was a weekend house for a small group of boarders and day children and also for a French/English summer school for children. The Junior School regularly spent a week or more there during the summer term with its form teachers.

The school continued to be popular, and was recognized as efficient by 1960. In 1969 it was proposed to adapt the house at 31 Glenloch Road, formerly used for boarders, for teachers' accommodation and as a laboratory. By 1974 it had 186 girls and boys aged 4 to 16.

=== The end of the school ===
The school closed at the end of the Summer term of 1982. It was reported in the Daily Telegraph that Mrs Paul owed the Inland Revenue £84,000: other creditors included Eton College (the lessors of the school buildings) and four teachers who, through their Union, claimed back pay. Ten years earlier the school had 300 pupils, but since then the numbers had gradually diminished. Incredibly the inspectors who had visited the school only the year before had decided to do nothing when they had been told about the dire financial situation. For that summer term there were just seven pupils and seven teachers, three of who were working loyally without claiming pay to get their pupils through their O-levels. The school had been recognised as efficient in 1969, but due to the system of recognition being abolished in 1976, there was nothing the inspectors could do as long as they were satifisfied with the teaching.

Mrs Paul, living in her house at 87 Belsize Park Gardens, had become more "autocratic and withdrawn", refusing offers of help. On being interviewed, she did not want to admit her age, saying that "if people knew, I would not be allowed to be headmistress". She said she would re-open the school "once this debt business is settled" and preferred to read Victor Hugo aloud. She lived on an eccentric diet, and admitted to being a lifelong adherent of the Alexander Technique. She owned two large houses in Hampstead, a house in the south of France and a property in Oxfordshire (probably Hedgerley Wood).

Early in 1985 Mrs Paul was ill and owed an estimated £300,000. In November of that year the Hampstead and Highgate Express reported that Mrs Paul "now mentally ill" had been offered an unfair price (£225,000) for her house by the owner of the neighbouring property "Fine Art Tutors", who wanted to extend. Had a fair price been offered, Mrs Paul would have been able to pay off her creditors: ironically, the property was soon put on the market again, selling for £350,000.

Elisabeth Paul (née Selver) was born in Darmstadt, Germany on 25 April 1895, and according to her death certificate died at Elmhurst Residential Home, 81-85 Holden Road, London N12 on 4 February 1991, of Bronchopneumonia and Extreme Old Age. She was nearly 96.

== Notable students ==
- Sarah Branch – model and film actress
- Julian Chagrin (also known as Julian Joy Chagrin) – comedian, mime artist, writer and director, son of composer Francis Chagrin and husband of actress and comedian Rolanda Chagrin
- Amanda Donohoe- actress
- Anjelica Huston – actress
- Mark A. Landis – painter
- Caroline Mortimer – actress
- Angela Pleasence – actress
- Miles Richardson – actor
- Paul Robeson, Jr. – son of singer Paul Robeson
- Anthony Roland – producer and director of films on art and creator of the Roland Collection of Films and Videos on Art
- Craig Sams – journalist, author and chocolatier – founder of Green & Black's chocolate
- Gregory Sams – fractal artist, social thinker, author, publisher, inventor, macrobioticist and creator of the VegeBurger
- Carole Shelley – actress
- Naomi Stadlen - writer on motherhood (1942–2025)
- Alisha Sufit – singer, songwriter, visual artist and poet

== Notable staff ==
- Harrison Birtwistle

== Film ==
The BBC2 documentary Six Sides of a Square: 2, Worlds of their Own. has live footage of the school. The clip shown has 8 minutes of excerpts from the program transmitted on 15 March 1966, showing aspects of St Mary's Town & Country School with an interview of Mrs Paul. The BBC have since deleted the whole series from their archive, so this is a rare fragment.

Synopsis: Film of two children who both live in Gibson Square, Islington. The young boy comes from a working class home and lives in a basement flat in the square, his friend lives in a large house in the square, and she goes to a private school. Various shots of children playing in the garden of Gibson Square in Islington appear throughout the film. The parents of two of the children that live in Gibson Square, Islington talk about the education they are giving their children and what they expect their children to do when they leave school. The working class family send their son to a council school, and have little idea of the methods of education used there, while the upper class family have chosen to send their children to a private progressive school. Various shots of schoolchildren at a progressive school in Hampstead, children read stories, speak French, etc. Headmistress talks about the aims of the school and its methods. Shots of children in playground and in ...
