= Susan Robeson =

American author

- Born: 1953 (age 72–73)
- Occupation: Author, producer
- Notable works: The Whole World In His Hands
- Children: 1
- Parents: Paul Robeson Jr. (father); Marilyn Paula Greenberg (mother)
- Relatives: William Drew Robeson (great-grandfather); Maria Louisa Bustill (great-grandmother); Paul Robeson (grandfather); Eslanda Goode (grandmother)

Susan Robeson (born 1953) is an American author, producer and the granddaughter of Paul Robeson.

== Early life ==
Robeson studied at Antioch College in Yellow Springs, Ohio as well as at New York University. Classes in communications, history and culture were primary areas of focus.

== Career ==
Robeson was inspired to enter the documentary journalism field by her grandfather's misrepresentation by the media and the lack of positive black character roles in film.

Robeson's first work was to co-direct Teach Our Children, for Third World Newsreel. The film focuses on the 1971 prison rebellion at Attica in upstate New York.

Robeson's book The Whole World In His Hands: A Pictorial Biography of Paul Robeson explores many of her grandfather's accomplishments from his stage performances, to private moments and his political activist period. The book's intent is to allow Robeson to posthumously speak for himself and correct media misrepresentations. The biography consists of essays written by Susan, reflections from Paul Robeson himself, such as his opinion of his film Sanders of the River, and photographs from the family's library of 50,000 materials. Photos from the 1949 Peekskill riots capture the beating of Eugene Bullard by two policemen, a state trooper and a concert-goer. All of which went unprosecuted. The New York book party included invitations featuring Lena Horne and performances by Odetta and Pete Seeger.

In the 1980s, New York's WABC-TV had a black public affairs program Like It Is, on which Robeson worked as an associate producer. In 1982 the Robert F. Kennedy Journalism Award recognized her for her contribution to WABC-TV's "Essay on Drugs."

In the 1990s, Robeson was the executive producer for community affairs at Twin Cities Public Television.

As an educator, she has taught on Paul Robeson and documentary film at Macalester College, Carleton College and Colorado College.

Robeson published a children's book, Grandpa Stops a War about his peacemaking efforts on the front lines of the Spanish Civil War.

== Legacy ==
In celebration of her grandfather's 100th birthday, Somerville Middle School invited Robeson as the featured speaker to honor her late grandfather as the winners of the Paul Robeson Essay Contest were awarded.

Robeson has lectured often on her grandfather's opinions and accomplishments and attended ceremonies in his honor. She is the chair of the Paul Robeson Foundation.

At the Second Annual Paul Robeson Lecture Series, a part of Paul Robeson's alma mater Rutgers University's "America Converges Here" campaign, Susan along with Harry Belafonte shared the lessons of Paul Robeson.

== Family ==
Robeson is the daughter of author Paul Robeson Jr. and Marilyn Paula Greenberg, who were married in New York City in 1949 with a mob outside protesting their interracial union. She is the granddaughter of singer, actor and activist Paul Robeson Sr. and anthropologist and author Eslanda Goode Robeson. Her great-grandfather William Drew Robeson I was an escaped slave who became a minister and married a Quaker schoolteacher, Maria Louisa Bustill, making Robeson a descendant of the Bustill family. She has one son.

== Publications ==
- The Whole World In His Hands: A Pictorial Biography of Paul Robeson. Citadel Press, 1981
- Grandpa Stops a War: A Paul Robeson story, Penguin Random House, 2019
