= Paul Robeson Jr. =

American academic (1927–2014)

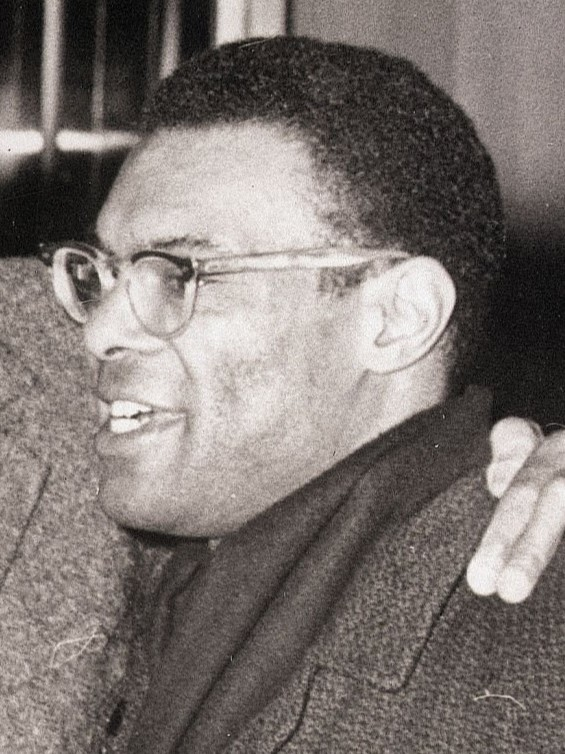
- Robeson in 1963
- Born: November 2, 1927; Brooklyn, New York, US
- Died: April 26, 2014 (aged 86); Jersey City, New Jersey, US
- Education: Cornell University (1949)
- Occupations: Author, historian
- Spouse: Marilyn Paula Greenberg (m. 1949)
- Children: 2 (including Susan Robeson)
- Parent(s): Paul Robeson; Eslanda Goode Robeson
- Relatives: Bustill family

Paul Leroy Robeson Jr. (November 2, 1927 – April 26, 2014) was an American author, archivist and historian.

== Biography ==
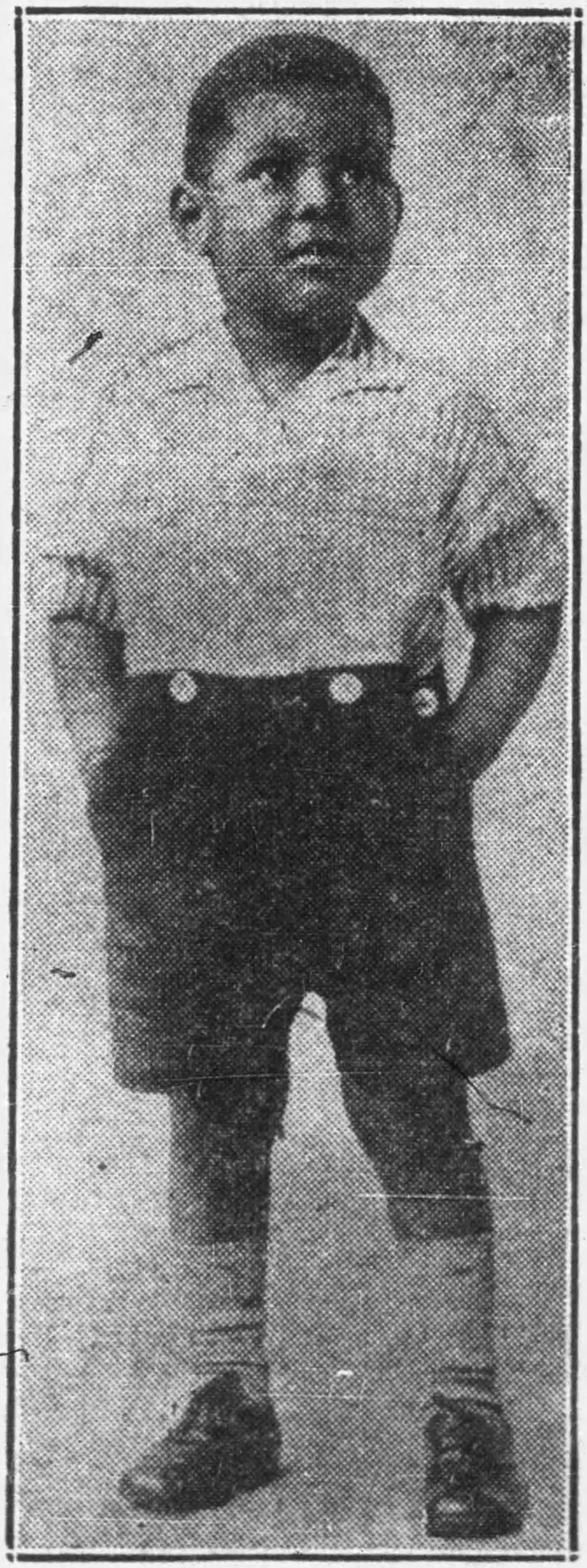
Robeson c. 1936

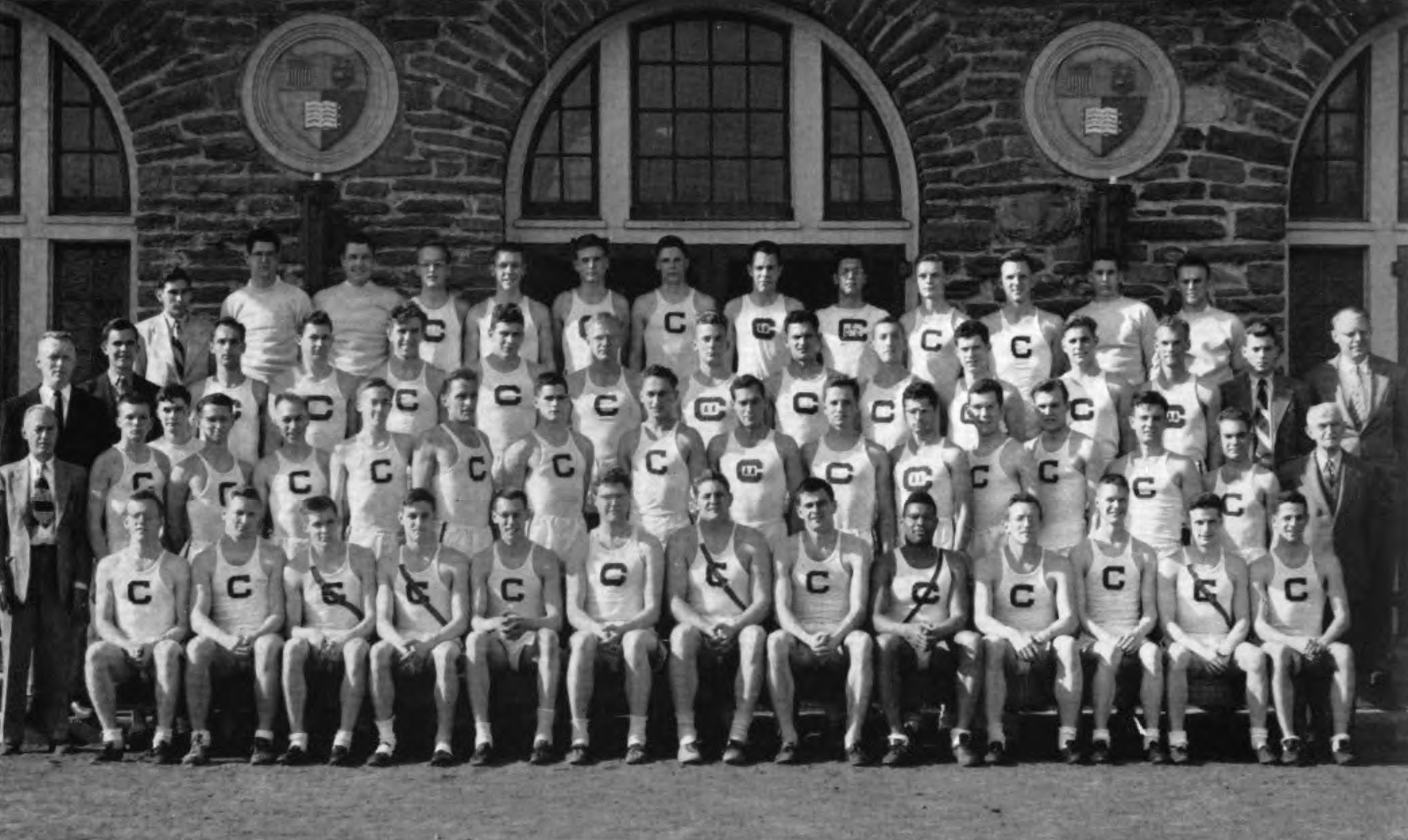
Robeson (bottom row, fifth from right) with other members of the Cornell University track team, 1950

Robeson was born in Brooklyn to lawyer, actor, singer and activist Paul Robeson and chemist, author and activist Eslanda Goode Robeson. As his family moved to Europe, he grew up in England (visiting the St Mary's Town and Country School in London) and Moscow, in the Soviet Union. In Moscow, he attended an elite school. The Robesons returned to the United States in 1939 to live first in Harlem, New York, and after 1941 in Enfield, Connecticut. Robeson graduated from Enfield High School and attended Cornell University, where he graduated with a degree in electrical engineering in 1949.

Robeson's paternal grandfather Reverend William Drew Robeson was born into slavery, escaped from a plantation in his teens and eventually became the minister of Princeton's Witherspoon Street Presbyterian Church in 1881. Robeson's paternal grandmother, Maria Louisa Bustill was from a prominent Quaker family of mixed ancestry: African, Anglo-American, and Lenape.

Robeson worked on the legacy of his father, published a two-volume biography of him, and created an archive of his father's films, photographs, recordings, letters, and publications. As an advocate for social and racial justice he shared the political views of his father, indicating that "like him, I am a black radical". He was married to Marilyn Greenberg in 1949; the couple had two children, David (died 1998) and Susan, and one grandchild.

Robeson died of lymphoma in Jersey City, New Jersey, in 2014.

== Paul Robeson Sr. legacy ==
Robeson maintained on many occasions that his father "never joined the Communist Party or any party for that matter—he was an independent artist and would never submit to any kind of organizational discipline."

On his own politics he stated: "I was much more an organized political person", he said, adding that from about 1948 to 1962, he was a member of the Communist Party USA. "It was an instrument, a radical instrument that could help advance the interests of African-Americans. It helped build the early civil-rights movement and independent trade union movement in the 1930s, '40s and '50s." He said he left the party in 1962 after "it became bureaucratic and corrupt".

Robeson's father, Paul Sr., was one of his closest friends and protectors, traveling and living with him intermittently during his life. Following his father's death, Robeson Jr. worked extensively to establish the Paul Robeson Archive and the Paul Robeson Foundation. The archive, housed at Howard University's Moorland-Spingarn Research Center, is the largest repository in the Western hemisphere of Robeson documents and articles, totaling well over 50,000 items. In the documentary film His Name was Robeson (1998) by Nikolay Milovidov he spoke about a previously unknown episode from his father's biography, which his father told him before death. It was a secret conversation between Paul Robeson with the Jewish poet Itzik Feffer about the circumstances of Solomon Mikhoels' death. He was of Igbo descent through his father.

== Bibliography ==
- Boyle, Sheila Tully; Buni, Andrew (2005). Paul Robeson: The Years of Promise and Achievement. Univ of Massachusetts Press. ISBN 978-1-55849-505-0.
- Brown, Lloyd L. (1997). The Young Paul Robeson: 'On My Journey Now'. Basic Books. ISBN 978-0813331782.
- Robeson, Paul (1993). Paul Robeson, Jr. speaks to America. New Brunswick, N.J.: Rutgers University Press. ISBN 978-0-8135-1985-2. OCLC 1036772630.
- Robeson, Paul (2001). The Undiscovered Paul Robeson: An Artist's Journey, 1898-1939. New York: John Wiley & Sons. ISBN 0-471-24265-9.
- Robeson, Paul (2010). The Undiscovered Paul Robeson: A Quest for Freedom. New York: John Wiley & Sons Incorporated. ISBN 978-0-471-40973-1.
- Black Way of Seeing: From "Liberty" to Freedom. New York: Seven Stories Press. 2006. ISBN 1-58322-725-3.
- "The Counterfeit 'Paul Robeson.'". The New York Amsterdam News. 91 (9): 24–25. March 2, 2000.
