= Sarah Branch =

English actress and model (1938–2007)

- Born: 7 January 1938; London, England
- Died: 10 November 2007 (aged 69); Esher, Surrey, England
- Occupations: Actress; model
- Years active: 1960–1965
- Spouse: John Grant Lithiby (1961–2002) (his death) (3 children)

Sarah Branch (7 January 1938 – 10 November 2007) was an English film actress and model.

== Life ==
Before appearing in films Sarah Branch modelled wedding gowns at fashion shows. She acted in two Hammer Film productions. She played Maid Marian, opposite Richard Greene as Robin Hood, in Sword of Sherwood Forest. Before that she had a small role as a deaf mute girl in Hammer's Noir-like crime drama Hell Is a City.

She went to the progressive co-educational St. Mary's Town and Country School. She married stockbroker John Grant Lithiby in 1961, and they had three children. She died of a terminal illness in 2007.

== Filmography ==
- The Night We Dropped a Clanger, released in the US as Make Mine a Double (1959)
- Hell Is a City (1960)
- Sands of the Desert (1960)
- Sword of Sherwood Forest (1960)
