= Witherspoon Street Presbyterian Church =

Church in New Jersey, United States

Coordinates: 40°21′11″N 74°39′42″W

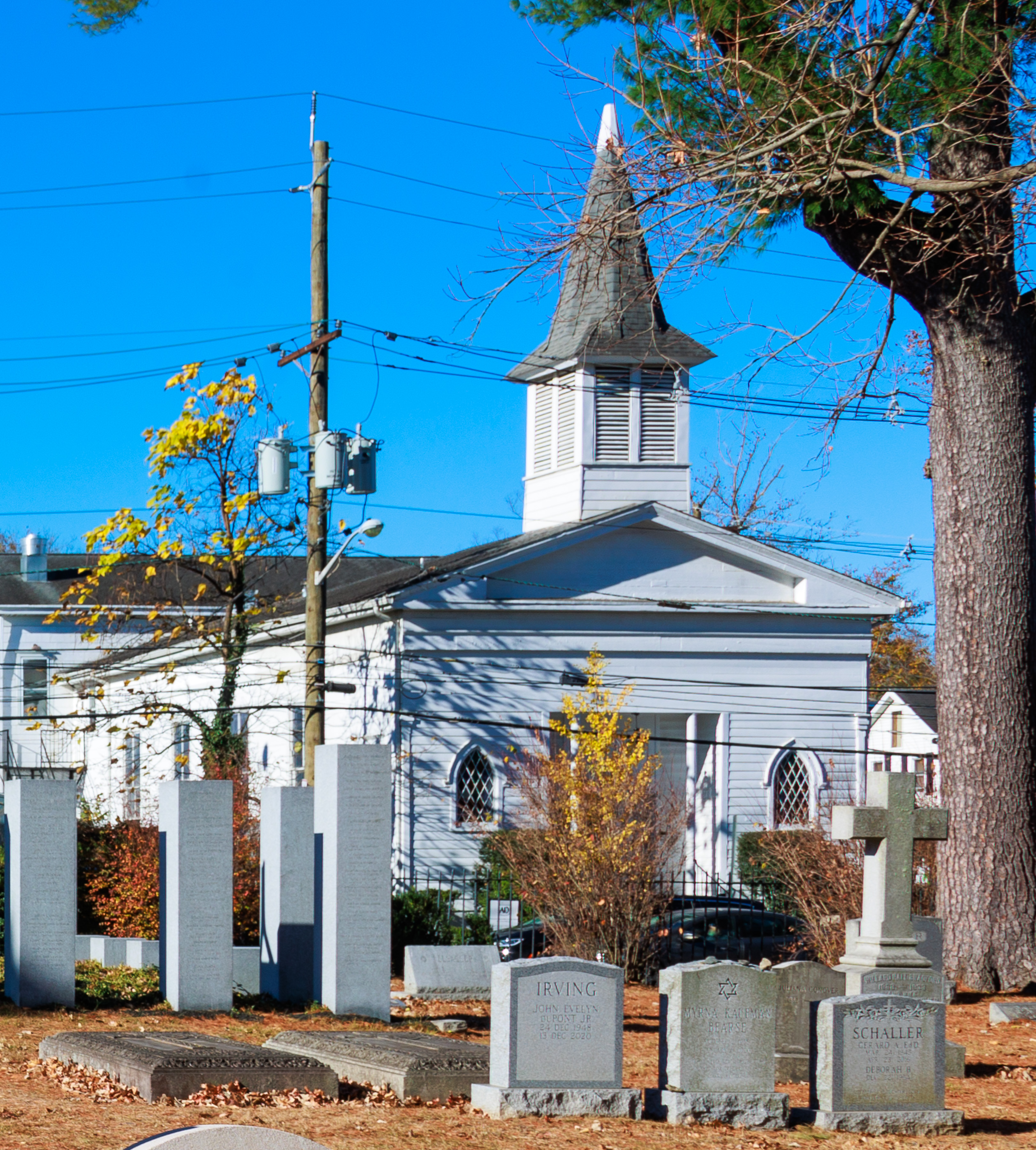
Witherspoon Street Presbyterian Church

Witherspoon Street Presbyterian Church was founded in 1839 in Princeton, New Jersey. The church was formed after the Nassau Presbyterian Church allowed 90 of the 131 former African American members to form their own church, after a fire had devastated the Nassau church. The church is among New Jersey's oldest African American Presbyterian congregations.

The sanctuary was built in 1840 in the Greek Revival style. The recessed entrance was a new and common design feature on religious architecture of the time. The church was first called the "First Presbyterian Church of Color of Princeton", but reported to the General Assembly in 1845 as the "Witherspoon Street Presbyterian Church".

Betsey Stockton, who may have been the first black Presbyterian missionary in the U.S., helped found the church after she returned to Princeton in 1835 from her work as a missionary in Hawaii. Reverend William Drew Robeson led the church as pastor from 1879. Robeson moved into the church parsonage with his wife Maria Louisa Bustill of Philadelphia, Pennsylvania, and there they raised their children, including Paul Robeson. Reverend Robeson was a former slave, and as such he preached racial equality, which eventually led to his forced resignation in 1901 for being "too radical." Susie Ione Brown Waxwood, a YWCA official and local clubwoman, joined Witherspoon in 1942; she was an ordained elder and president of the Women's Association.

In 2018, the church installed a new pastor, Reverend Lukata Mjumbe, a graduate of the Princeton Theological Seminary.
