= Here I Am a Stranger =

1939 film by Roy Del Ruth

- Theatrical release poster
- Directed by: Roy Del Ruth
- Screenplay by: Milton Sperling and Sam Hellman
- Story by: Gordon Malherbe Hillman
- Produced by: Darryl F. Zanuck in charge of production Harry Joe Brown (associate producer)
- Starring: Richard Greene; Richard Dix; Brenda Joyce; Roland Young; Gladys George; Katharine Aldridge; Russell Gleason; George Zucco; Edward Norris; Henry Kolker
- Cinematography: Arthur Miller, A.S.C.
- Edited by: Louis Loeffler
- Music by: Louis Silvers (musical direction)
- Production company: 20th Century-Fox
- Distributed by: 20th Century-Fox
- Release date: September 28, 1939
- Running time: 82 minutes
- Country: United States
- Language: English

Here I Am a Stranger is a 1939 American drama film directed by Roy Del Ruth and written by Sam Hellman and Milton Sperling. The film stars Richard Greene and Richard Dix as son and father. It was based on the short story of the same name by Gordon Malherbe Hillman. The film was released on September 28, 1939, by 20th Century-Fox.

== Plot ==
=== Clara leaves her husband Duke for the sake of their son David ===
"New York City 1920". Anxiously sitting by the crib of her year-old son David, Clara hears a knock and a voice threatening to return "with a dispossess notice and a cop". As she starts packing a suitcase, her drunken husband Duke Allen comes home with a bouquet and a birthday rattle for David. He tells her that he quit his job and she tells him that she loves him, but has to leave him and go back home for David's sake.

=== David is planning to marry into the wealthy Bennett family ===
A card displays, "Love to David on his twentieth birthday from Mother & Dad", as David listens to "Happy Birthday" sung by Clara, her husband and David's adoptive father, prominent attorney James K. Paulding, R. J. Bennett's snobbish and immoral son Lester and daughter Lillian, with whom David has developed a personal relationship. R. J. himself, a wealthy businessman who employs Paulding, arrives late and immediately starts discussing business before giving David an expensive watch as a birthday and going-away-to-college present.

=== David goes to college and meets Duke again ===
At Stafford University, where Duke and Clara were once students, Lester is showing David the campus. They pass by the house of English professor Daniels and run into his beautiful daughter Simpson who has auto oil on her face while repairing her car. In Daniels' class, Davis is seated next to working class student Sortwell who was raised on a farm and works as a laundry deliveryman, but hopes to be an architect.

Daniels invites David and Sortwell to his home for a Saturday literary session and learns from David that his father was Duke Allen, a football hero and one of Daniels' earliest and most favorite students. He gives David a copy of a student publication from his father's era which contains one of Duke's most brilliant essays. David reads it and returns to Daniels' house where Simpson helps him to find his father's address in Boston.

David goes to visit Duke and finds him sleeping in a drunken stupor. However, upon seeing David, Duke quickly revives and steps into the shower. In the meantime, David finds a scrapbook of newspaper clippings from the social pages, indicating that his Duke has kept track of his son's progress. Father and son go out to have lunch at the local cafeteria where Duke is greeted by various locals. Duke is vague about his current employment, but invites David to join him in watching a college football game on Saturday.

As David returns to the campus, Clara comes to see him and he tells her about visiting Duke. Clara responds that the past is best left alone. On Saturday, at the game, Duke is enthusiastic, but David is reticent and barely greets Sortwell who passes by. By the time they return to Duke's lodgings, however, they are singing the team song. Duke finds a telegram from David declining to come and David confesses that he initially took Clara's advice, but then changed his mind. The next day, Duke visits the managing editor of the paper for which he used to write and asks to return because "you see, I got a family now".

=== David falls in love with Professor Daniels' daughter Simpson ===
At Thanksgiving, David visits Professor Daniels and watches Simpson count off dance steps for Sortwell who is trying to learn steps while holding a pillow. She then puts on a dance record and demonstrates a fast dance with David. With Sortwell still reluctant, David puts "Sweet Georgia Brown" on, grabs Sortwell and dances with him, spurring Simpson to run to her father's bedroom and inform him that she was breaking her habit of not attending college dances and intends to attend this one with him as her escort.

At the dance, David is partnered with Lillian who tells about a Yale boy who invited her to Hawaii. Sortwell can find no one to dance with him until Simpson arrives and takes him onto the dance floor, counting off their steps. At the end of one dance, they stop next to David and Lillian and, when Sortwell mentions his rented tuxedo, Lillian responds with a snobbish comment about Simpson's dress. David tells Lillian that he promised the next dance to Miss Daniels, prompting Sortwell to ask Lillian, "Would you like to dance with me?", to which she responds, "I would not" and walks away. During the dance, David apologizes to Simpson about Lillian's remarks, while Lester and another collegian trick tee-totaling Sortwell into drinking alcohol by telling him that it is simply punch.

David and Simpson go outside and when she makes self-deprecating remarks and unpins her hair, he tells her, "you're really wonderful", but as he moves to kiss her, she says, "can you imagine it, I'm shy". In the meantime, Sortwell has been drinking punch with Lester and two other collegians and has become inebriated. David leads him away from the punchbowl to his laundry delivery truck and watches him drive away. Lester, who is also drunk, pulls David into the passenger seat of his car and starts to drive at high speed while complaining that with David's constant trips to Boston, he never gets to see him anymore and that he is spending too much time with people such as Sortwell and Simpson.

=== Lester Bennett drives drunk and commits vehicular homicide ===
When David tells him that he's drunk, Lester starts to drive faster and hits a woman passerby. David tells him to stop, but Lester continues onward as Sortwell's laundry truck stops next to the fallen woman. Later that night, David walks into Duke's newsroom, but is too distraught to react to Duke's announcement that he is now the night editor of the Boston Tribune. He tells Duke what happened as Duke receives a call from one of his reporters that the woman is dead and Sortwell has been arrested as the guilty driver. Duke tells him that they will go to his lodgings together and decide what to do in the morning.

The following morning, Lester, his father, their lawyer Evans, Clara and Paulding are discussing the accident and whether David informed the police that Lester was the guilty driver. David arrives and, upon assuring them that he did not call the police, is pressured by Bennett and Evans that he should allow Sortwell to take the blame and save the family from an "unpleasant experience". David is outraged by such a suggestion prompting Bennett to threaten him with financial repercussions. Paulding says, "Don't talk to the boy like that" and takes David to his office where he explains that he married his mother when she was in difficult straits and did everything to provide for her and David and now expects David to repay him by remaining silent, otherwise the powerful and influential Bennett would crush him.

=== David stands on his principles and refuses to protect Lester ===
David, however, refuses to change his mind. Upon hearing that, Bennett says, "Evans, call the chief of police on the phone, tell him Lester's giving himself up... make it sound good... the boy's conscience bothers him... he doesn't want the other kid to take the blame for him... it'll swing public sympathy our way..." Clara then goes to her husband's office and tells David that she made all the sacrifices for him and now it's his turn to be grateful. David rejects that argument and tells her that he is going to stay with his real father. As soon as he leaves, Clara picks up the phone and calls Boston.

David waits at his father's lodgings and when Duke arrives he tells David that Clara and Paulding visited and offered him ten thousand dollars to go to South America and he jumped at the opportunity to leave his low-paying newspaper job and take a long trip. Deeply disappointed and disillusioned, David says goodbye and leaves. No longer employed by Bennett, Paulding is returning to his native England and Clara is coming with him. Having lost everything too, David is leaving with them and comes to say goodbye to Professor Daniels and Simpson. Sortwell is honking from his laundry truck, ready to take David to the train station, as he hugs and kisses Simpson who goes to her father's study and cries on his shoulder.

=== David returns to see Duke ===
A day before departure, Clara sees how desperately unhappy David is and tells him that she left Duke even though she loved him and that she married Paulding so that David would have happiness and now she will tell David the truth so that he will be happy — there was no monetary offer to Duke and he is not going to South America, implying that she may not be joining Paulding on his return to England. A newspaper office boy tells Duke that a man is outside to see him... a man who says he is his son. Duke stands up and begins walking with an ever-growing expression of happiness on his face.

== Cast ==
- Richard Greene as David
- Richard Dix as Duke Allen
- Brenda Joyce as Simpson Daniels
- Roland Young as Professor Daniels
- Gladys George as Clara
- Katharine Aldridge as Lillian Bennett
- Russell Gleason as Sortwell
- George Zucco as James K. Paulding
- Edward Norris as Lester Bennett
- Henry Kolker as R. J. Bennett
- Richard Bond as Digby
- Robert Shaw
- Robert Kellard as College Students
- Charles Wilson as Managing Editor
- Harry Hayden as Landlord
- Minor Watson as Evans

Uncredited (in order of appearance)
Frank Darien	Western Union messenger who sings "Happy Birthday" to David
Kitty McHugh	Patsy the waitress in the cafeteria where Duke and David have lunch
John Dilson	professor at Stafford College
Harold Goodwin	limousine chauffeur who drove Clara to Stafford College
Ed Brady	Kelly, a derelict from the mission who says hello to Duke in the cafeteria
Harry Strang	truck driver who says hello to Duke as he and David are walking away from the cafeteria
Robert Homans	cop on the beat near the cafeteria whom Duke proudly tells about his college student son
Delmar Watson	shoeshine boy in Duke's neighborhood
Sarah Edwards	chaperone at college dance
Robert Lowery	collegian at dance
Arthur Rankin	man sitting at the entrance desk to Duke's newsroom
Frank Coghlan Jr.	newspaper office boy who tells Duke that a man is outside who says he is his son

== Song credit ==
- "The Stafford Song" by Mack Gordon and Harry Revel
