= The Fan (1949 film) =

1949 film by Otto Preminger

- 1950 US Theatrical Poster
- Directed by: Otto Preminger
- Screenplay by: Walter Reisch; Dorothy Parker; Ross Evans
- Based on: Lady Windermere's Fan by Oscar Wilde
- Produced by: Otto Preminger
- Starring: Jeanne Crain; Madeleine Carroll; George Sanders; Richard Greene
- Cinematography: Joseph LaShelle
- Edited by: Louis Loeffler
- Music by: Daniele Amfitheatrof
- Production company: 20th Century Fox
- Distributed by: 20th Century Fox
- Release date: April 1, 1949
- Running time: 79 minutes
- Country: United States
- Language: English

The Fan is a 1949 American drama film directed by Otto Preminger, starring Jeanne Crain, Madeleine Carroll, George Sanders, and Richard Greene. The screenplay by Dorothy Parker, Walter Reisch, and Ross Evans is based on the 1892 play Lady Windermere's Fan by Oscar Wilde. The play had been filmed several times before, with a 1916 silent film, a later adaptation by Ernst Lubitsch in 1925 as well as versions in Spanish and Chinese.

== Plot ==
In a post-World War II London auction house, an elderly woman is trying to acquire an attractive fan she claims was once hers. A flashback to the Victorian era reveals she is the scandalous Mrs. Erlynne, who in middle age becomes associated with Lord Arthur Windermere, whose young and beautiful but socially conservative wife Margaret tends to judge others harshly. Lord Windermere financially supports Mrs. Erlynne, allowing her to live in the elegant manner to which she is accustomed, and the couple become the favourite subject of local gossips. When Margaret hears the stories, she mistakenly believes the two are involved in a clandestine affair and subsequently succumbs to the charms of Lord Robert Darlington, who has made no secret of his ongoing romantic interest in her. However, she leaves her fan - the one Robert offered her for her birthday - in Robert's house. In order to ensure the younger woman does not make the same mistakes she has in the past, Mrs. Erlynne reveals a shocking secret: she is Lady Windermere's mother, whom Margaret believed had died after the woman abandoned her husband and daughter for another man. In order to protect Margaret's reputation, Mrs. Erlynne sacrifices her own happiness by placing herself in a compromising position that jeopardizes her pending marriage to Augustus Lorton.

== Cast ==
- Jeanne Crain as Lady Margaret Windermere
- Madeleine Carroll as Mrs. Erlynne
- Richard Greene as Lord Arthur Windermere
- George Sanders as Lord Robert Darlington
- Martita Hunt as Duchess of Berwick
- John Sutton as Cecil Graham
- Hugh Dempster as Lord Augustus Lorton
- Richard Ney as James Hopper
- Virginia McDowall as Lady Agatha
- Randy Stuart as American Girl

== Principal production credits ==
- Producer ..... Otto Preminger
- Original Music ..... Daniele Amfitheatrof
- Cinematography ..... Joseph LaShelle
- Art Direction ..... Leland Fuller, Lyle R. Wheeler
- Set Decoration ..... Paul S. Fox, Thomas Little
- Costume Design ..... René Hubert, Charles Le Maire

== Production ==
Walter Reisch who worked on the script later recalled it as a "a non-Zanuck picture. Nothing could be further removed from his way of thinking than Oscar Wilde, or Lady Windemere, or Mrs. Erlynne. It was just too Victorian, too elegant, and too slow. Everyone spoke like everyone else, very stilted and mechanical dialogue—brilliant, the most wonderful dialogue on earth, but totally inhuman. Zanuck just didn't care for it, so Otto was left alone and it was dragged out... Nobody was hurt by the picture, and nobody was elated either."

== Reception ==
=== Box office ===
Variety listed the film as a box office disappointment.

=== Critical reception ===
In his review in The New York Times, Bosley Crowther observed, "Most of the brittle wit and satire of Mr. Wilde's conversation piece has been lost in the making of this . . . nicely costumed picture [which] is a strangely uninspired nostalgic romance."

TV Guide rated the film two out of a possible four stars and commented, "Preminger's version, despite a strong cast, was bowdlerized by the scripters into a soapy mess . . . As is too often the case with filmed classics, dialog was sacrificed to further a perverted plot. Wilde's witty aphorisms were excised, and with them went any merit the film might have had."

Variety said that the adaption was "refreshing and neatly uses the flashback technique", and it praised the "strong production values" and Preminger's "judicious use of unusual camera shots", as well as the pacing, editing and cinematography.
