= Richard Greene =

English film and TV actor (1918–1985)

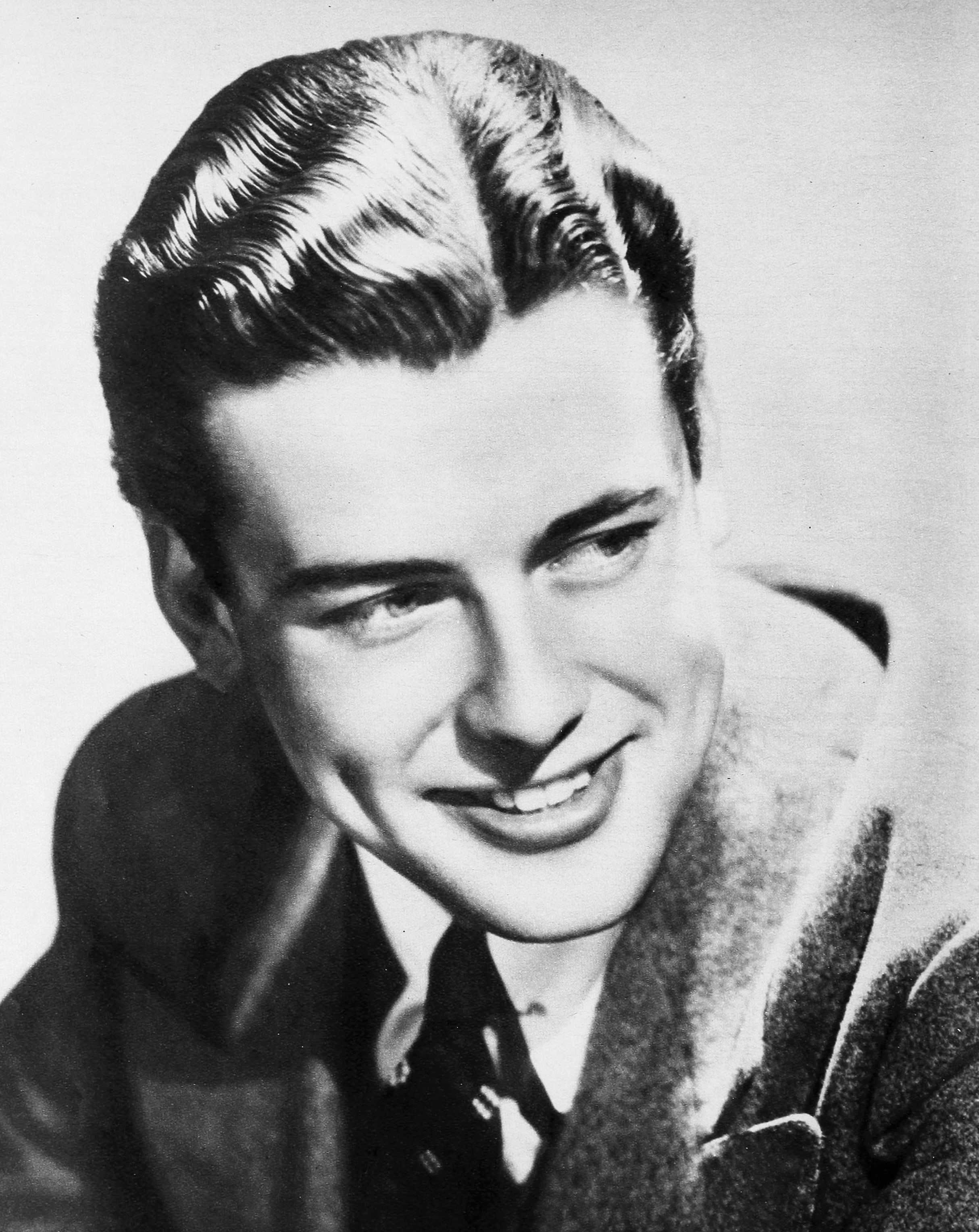
- Greene in 1938.
- Born: Richard Marius Joseph Greene; 25 August 1918; Plymouth, England
- Died: 1 June 1985 (aged 66); Holt, Norfolk, England
- Occupation: Actor
- Years active: 1933–1982
- Spouses: Patricia Medina (m. 1941; div. 1951) Beatriz Summers (m. 1960; div. 1980)
- Children: 1

Richard Marius Joseph Greene (25 August 1918 – 1 June 1985) was an English actor. A matinée idol who appeared in more than 40 films, he played Robin Hood in the British television series The Adventures of Robin Hood, which ran on ITV for 143 episodes from 1955 to 1959.

== Early life ==
Greene was born in Plymouth, Devon, England. He was raised Roman Catholic, attending Cardinal Vaughan Memorial School (Kensington, London), which he left at 18. His aunt was actress Evie Greene. His father, Richard Abraham Greene and his mother, Kathleen Gerrard, were both actors with the Plymouth Repertory Theatre. He was the grandson of Richard Bentley Greene and a descendant of four generations of actors.

It has been stated elsewhere that Greene was the grandson of the inventor William Friese-Greene, (credited by some as the inventor of cinematography) but this was found to be false, as a result of two parallel lines of genealogical research, conducted by the British Film Institute and Paul Pert respectively, the latter being subsequently published in 2009.

== Career ==
Greene started his stage career as a spear carrier in Shakespeare's Julius Caesar at the Old Vic in 1933. A handsome young man, Greene added to his income by modelling shirts and hats. He appeared in a stage production of Journey's End and had a small role in Sing As We Go (1934). He joined the Jevan Brandon Repertory Company in 1936, appearing in Antony and Cleopatra. He won accolades in the same year for his part in Terence Rattigan's French Without Tears, which brought him to the attention of MGM, Alexander Korda and Darryl F. Zanuck, who all made offers for films. On 17 January 1938 Greene signed with Fox.

=== 20th Century Fox ===
At 20, Greene joined 20th Century Fox as a rival to MGM's Robert Taylor. His first film for Fox was John Ford's Four Men and a Prayer (1938). Greene was a huge success, especially with female film goers, who sent him mountains of fan mail which at its peak rivalled that of Fox star Tyrone Power.

Greene co-starred with Sonia Henie in My Lucky Star (1938) and was reunited with Ford in Submarine Patrol (1939). Zanuck put him in Kentucky (1938) with Loretta Young and Walter Brennan.

Greene was the romantic male lead in the Shirley Temple vehicle The Little Princess (1939) and was Sir Henry Baskerville in the 1939 Sherlock Holmes film The Hound of the Baskervilles. The film marked the first pairing of Basil Rathbone and Nigel Bruce as Sherlock Holmes and Dr. Watson, but it was Greene who was top billed.

Greene had a supporting part in Stanley and Livingstone (1939) with Spencer Tracy and the lead in Here I Am a Stranger (1939). He co-starred with Alice Faye and Fred MacMurray in Little Old New York (1940) and supported Vera Zorina in I Was an Adventuress (1940). He had failed to become a major star but he was still playing leads in "A" movies when World War II began.

=== World War II ===
Greene tried to enlist in the Seaforth Highlanders in Vancouver, but they would not give him a commission. He obtained a release from Fox and travelled to England where he enlisted in the 27th Lancers, where he distinguished himself. After three months, he went to the Royal Military College, Sandhurst and was commissioned and given the service number of 184251. He was promoted to captain in the 27th Lancers in May 1944.

Greene was given leave in 1942 to appear in the British propaganda films Flying Fortress (1942) for Warners and Unpublished Story (1942) with Valerie Hobson. In 1943, he appeared in the Anna Neagle thriller Yellow Canary while on leave. He also appeared in a British comedy Don't Take It to Heart (1944).

Greene later toured in Shaw's Arms and the Man, entertaining the troops. Greene was discharged in December 1944 and appeared in the stage play Desert Rats.

=== Return to Hollywood ===
After the war, Greene starred in a British musical, distributed by Warners, Gaiety George (1946), which was a flop. He returned to Hollywood, and appeared in Fox's big budget Forever Amber (1947), but in support of Cornel Wilde. He went to Universal to play the villain in The Fighting O'Flynn (1948) with Douglas Fairbanks Jr. At Fox he was third billed in The Fan (1949), based on the play Lady Windermere's Fan.

Greene returned to England to appear in That Dangerous Age (1949) and Now Barabbas (1949). He went back to Universal in Hollywood to play the hero in a Yvonne de Carlo eastern, The Desert Hawk (1950). Director de Cordova said Greene was "everything a man or woman could want in a desert hero."

In Britain, Greene was in My Daughter Joy (1950), and Shadow of the Eagle (1950). He went to Italy to make The Rival of the Empress (1951). In 1951, he divorced his wife, Patricia Medina, whom he had married in 1941.

In Hollywood, Edward Small asked Greene to play the male hero of Lorna Doone (1951). He stayed on to star in The Black Castle (1952) and support Peter Lawford in Rogue's March (1952). For Small he made The Bandits of Corsica (1953), then he was in another swashbuckler, Captain Scarlett (1953) shot in Mexico.

=== The Adventures of Robin Hood ===
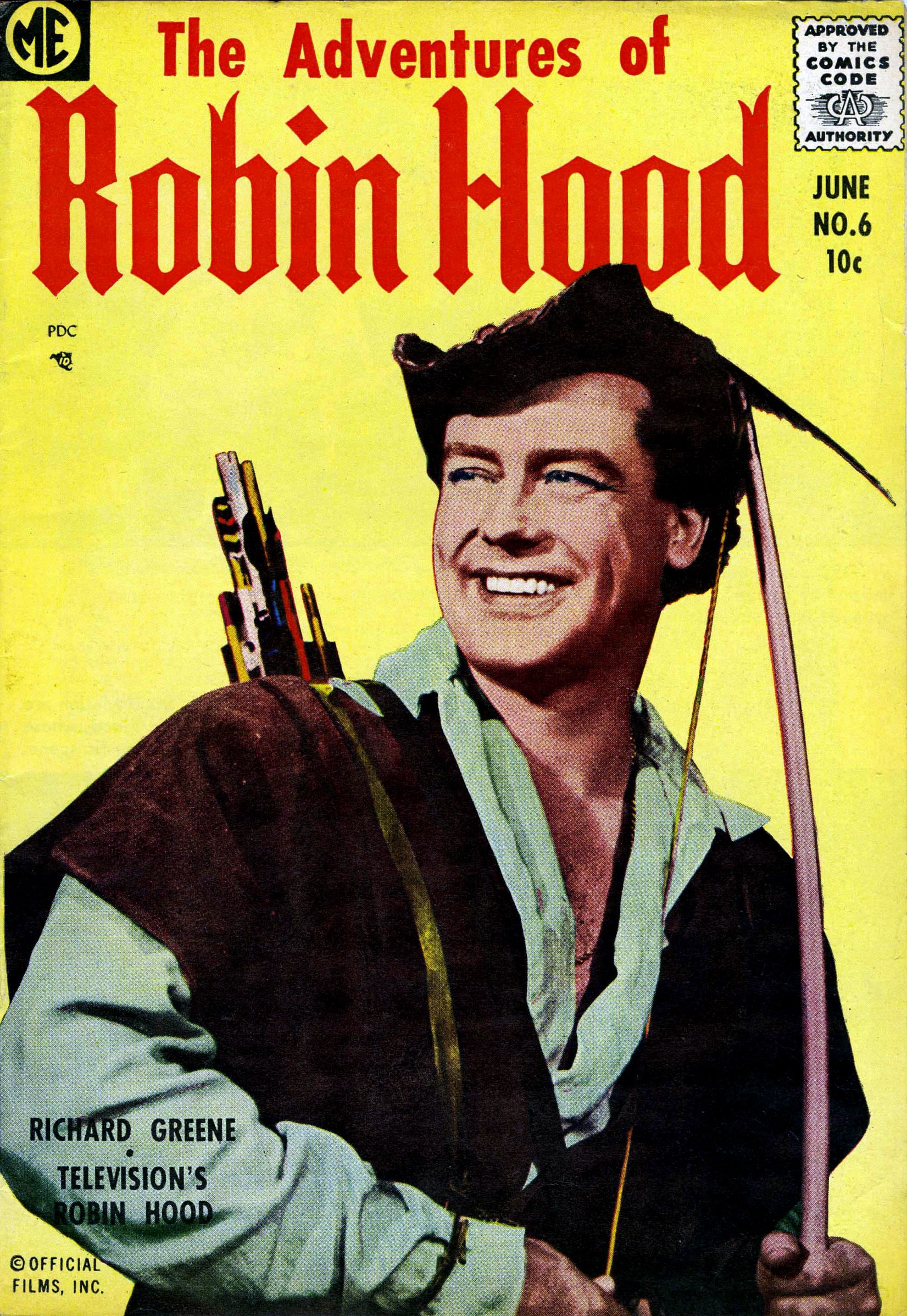

Greene returned to Britain looking for work. Reflecting on his career he said "I haven't had the big build-up part I expected. They turned me into a cloak-and-dagger merchant. After four dungeon pictures in a row I decided to throw it up."

Greene got a role on stage in a production of I Capture the Castle with Virginia McKenna. Then Yeoman Films of Great Britain approached him for the lead role in the TV series The Adventures of Robin Hood (1955–59). He was an immediate success in it. The series and a number of related marketing products bearing his likeness, such as comic books and "Robin Hood Shoes", solved his financial problems, with success both in the United Kingdom and the United States.

During the series's run Greene made the occasional film such as Contraband Spain (1955), Beyond the Curtain (1960), and Sword of Sherwood Forest (1960), as Robin Hood.

=== TV and Fu Manchu ===
Amongst other TV programmes, Greene was in A Man For Loving, The Doctors, The Morecambe and Wise Show, Dixon of Dock Green, Scarf Jack, as corrupt businessman Neil Turvey in The Professionals episode "Everest Was Also Conquered", and the Tales of the Unexpected episode "Mrs. Bixby and the Colonel's Coat".

Greene replaced Douglas Wilmer to play Denis Nayland Smith in two of Harry Alan Towers's Fu Manchu films, The Blood of Fu Manchu (1968) and The Castle of Fu Manchu (1969). Both films were directed by Jess Franco and shot in Spain.

== Personal life ==
Greene had a long love affair in the 1950s with Nancy Oakes (1925–2005), the wealthy daughter of mining tycoon Harry Oakes. Their daughter, Patricia Luisa Oakes (1951–2012), became the wife of Franklin D. Roosevelt Jr..

== Later life and death ==
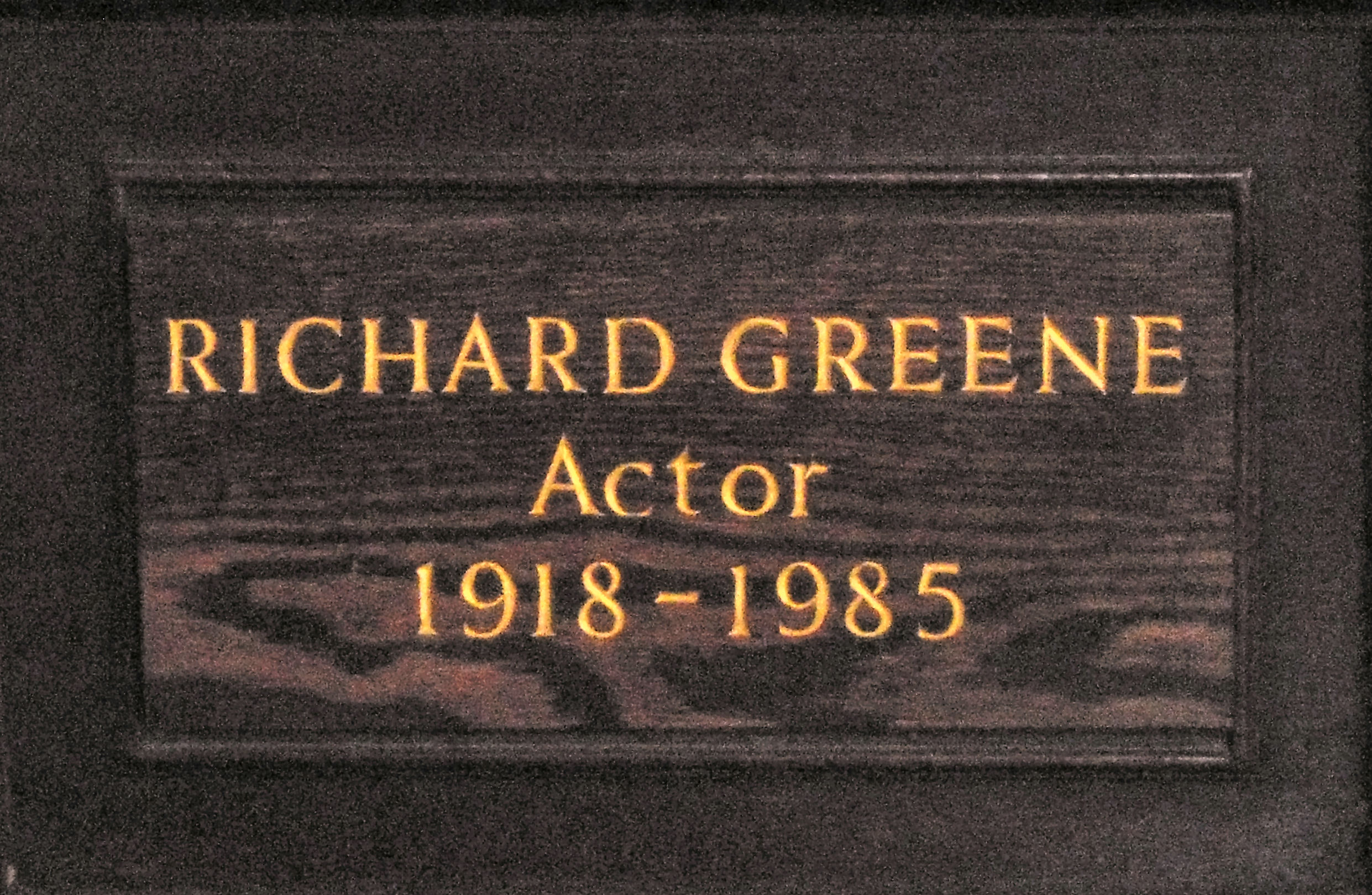
Memorial plaque in St Paul's, Covent Garden.

In 1972 Greene was unwittingly embroiled in the Lewis v Averay court case, after a fraudster pretending to be Greene had purchased a vehicle.

Greene died in 1985 of cardiac arrest at his home at Kelling Hall, Norfolk, England, aged 66. His daughter, Patricia, said he had never completely recovered from an injury sustained from a fall three years earlier. "He still had quite a fan club and was receiving letters requesting signed pictures", she said.

== Filmography ==
- Sing As We Go (1934) – Bit
- Four Men and a Prayer (1938) – Geoffrey Leigh
- My Lucky Star (1938) – Larry Taylor
- Submarine Patrol (1938) – Perry Townsend III
- Kentucky (1938) – Jack Dillon
- The Little Princess (1939) – Geoffrey Hamilton
- The Hound of the Baskervilles (1939) – Sir Henry Baskerville
- Stanley and Livingstone (1939) – Gareth Tyce
- Here I Am a Stranger (1939) – David Paulding
- Little Old New York (1940) – Robert Fulton
- I Was an Adventuress (1940) – Paul Vernay
- Flying Fortress (1942) – James "Jim" Spence Jr.
- Unpublished Story (1942) – Bob Randall
- Yellow Canary (1943) – Lieutenant Commander Jim Garrick
- Don't Take It to Heart (1944) – Peter Hayward
- Gaiety George, also known as Showtime (1946) – George Howard
- Forever Amber (1947) – Lord Harry Almsbury
- The Fighting O'Flynn (1949) – Lord Philip Sedgemonth
- The Fan (1949) – Lord Arthur Windermere
- That Dangerous Age or If This Be Sin (1949) – Michael Barcleigh
- Now Barabbas (1949) – Tufnell
- The Desert Hawk (1950) – Omar aka The Desert Hawk
- My Daughter Joy (Operation X) (1950) – Larry
- Shadow of the Eagle (1950) – Count Alexei Orloff
- The Rival of the Empress (1951) – Conte Alexei Orloff
- Lorna Doone (1951) – John Ridd
- The Black Castle (1952) – Sir Ronald Burton, alias Richard Beckett
- Rogue's March (1953) – Capt. Thomas Garron
- The Bandits of Corsica (1953) – Mario / Carlos
- Captain Scarlett (1953) – Capt. Carlos Scarlett
- Contraband Spain (1955) – Treasury Agent Lee Scott
- Beyond the Curtain (1960) – Capt. Jim Kyle
- Sword of Sherwood Forest (1960) – Robin Hood
- Island of the Lost (1968) – Josh MacRae
- The Blood of Fu Manchu (1968) – Sir Dennis Nayland-Smith
- The Castle of Fu Manchu (1969) – Sir Dennis Nayland-Smith
- Tales from the Crypt (1972) – Ralph Jason (segment 4 "Wish You Were Here")
