= Four Men and a Prayer =

1938 film directed by John Ford

- Film poster
- Directed by: John Ford
- Written by: Richard Sherman; Sonya Levien; Walter Ferris; William Faulkner (uncredited)
- Screenplay by: Richard Sherman; Sonya Levien; Walter Ferris
- Based on: Four Men and a Prayer; 1937 novel by David Garth (1908-1983)
- Produced by: Kenneth Macgowan
- Starring: Loretta Young; Richard Greene; George Sanders; David Niven; C. Aubrey Smith; William Henry
- Cinematography: Ernest Palmer
- Edited by: Louis R. Loeffler
- Music by: Louis Silvers
- Production company: 20th Century Fox
- Distributed by: 20th Century Fox
- Release date: April 29, 1938
- Running time: 85 minutes
- Country: United States
- Languages: English; Spanish

Four Men and a Prayer is a 1938 American adventure film directed by John Ford and starring Loretta Young, Richard Greene, George Sanders, and David Niven.

== Plot ==
After Loring Leigh, a British Army officer, is cashiered in India following accusations of dereliction of duty, he summons his four sons, Geoffrey, Wyatt, Christopher, and Rodney, to meet him in their family home. Leigh reveals he has been framed, but before he can explain any more, he is murdered. With what little they know, the four boys immediately set out to discover the truth. The boys split up and travel to South America, India, and Egypt to gather evidence and restore their father's honour.

During their travels, Geoffrey's girlfriend, Lynn, continually appears in the same locations as Geoffrey and Christopher. First, Geoffrey and Christopher encounter Lynn in Buenos Aires, where they witness the massacre of townspeople who were at war with the government, while Wyatt and Rodney are in India. Later, Geoffrey and Christopher run into Lynn in Alexandria, when they reunite with Wyatt and Rodney to confront Lynn's father, Martin Cherrington, whom they believe is the person responsible for their father's death. Then, they discover that Lynn had no idea of the situation and was not on her father's side about his contribution to being a major arms dealer, but her father is found to have had no part in the death of the boys' father.

Once they discover that Furnoy is responsible for Leigh's murder, the four boys journey back home to present the evidence that their father was innocent.

== Cast ==
- Loretta Young as Miss Lynn Cherrington
- Richard Greene as Geoffrey Leigh
- George Sanders as Wyatt Leigh
- David Niven as Christopher Leigh
- C. Aubrey Smith as Col. Loring Leigh
- William Henry as Rodney Leigh
- J. Edward Bromberg as Gen. Torres
- John Carradine as Gen. Adolfo Arturo Sebastian
- Alan Hale as Mr. Furnoy
- Reginald Denny as Capt. Douglas Loveland
- Berton Churchill as Mr. Martin Cherrington
- Barry Fitzgerald as Trooper Mulcahay
- Claude King as Gen. Bryce
- Cecil Cunningham as Piper
- John Sutton as Capt. Drake

== Reception ==
The response to Four Men and a Prayer was mixed.

The New York Times' Frank Nugent enjoyed the film. In his May 7, 1938, review, he described the film as "A globetrotting melodrama, a beau-gestive piece directed by John Ford, who loves to stab the murk with a revolver spat. It has been energetically told, compactly presented, and can be relied upon to keep the Roxy pleasantly occupied… the players are uniformly in excellent fettle…"

Mae Tinee from the Chicago Daily Tribune observed, "There's nothing like a good melodrama for grinding new grooves in the old thinking machine, and Four Men and a Prayer is a right pert groove grinder."

However, Variety said the film "starts out as exciting melodrama, promising interesting romantic and adventurous...finishes as a piece of disappointing entertainment."

The film has a 50% rating on Rotten Tomatoes, based on six reviews.
