= Catweazle =

British children's television series (1970–1971)

- Catweazle opening titles
- Created by: Richard Carpenter
- Starring: Geoffrey Bayldon; Robin Davies; Gary Warren; Bud Tingwell; Neil McCarthy; Moray Watson; Peter Butterworth; Elspet Gray; Gwen Nelson; John Ringham; Peter Sallis; Patricia Hayes
- Country of origin: United Kingdom
- No. of series: 2
- No. of episodes: 26

Production
- Running time: 25 minutes
- Production company: London Weekend

Original release
- Network: ITV
- Release: 15 February 1970 – 4 April 1971

Catweazle is a British children's fantasy television series, starring Geoffrey Bayldon in the title role, and created by Richard Carpenter for London Weekend Television. The first series, produced and directed in 1969 by Quentin Lawrence, was screened in the UK on ITV in 1970. The second series, produced and directed in 1970 by David Reid and David Lane, was shown in 1971. Both series had thirteen episodes, most written by Carpenter, who also published a book for each series based on the scripts.

== Origins ==
A former actor, Richard Carpenter had decided to switch to screenwriting in the 1960s. While driving home from his brother-in-law's farm, Carpenter became lost in the countryside. While consulting a map, Carpenter noticed the name "Catweazle" scratched into an old stone gatepost. The name stuck with Carpenter and he decided to use it. Carpenter was inspired to create a TV show about a wizard after seeing a picture of a "wizardly old man" in the bottom left corner of the Hieronymus Bosch painting "Christ Crowned with Thorns". Carpenter then decided that his wizard character would be a time traveller, and would travel from the Middle Ages into the twentieth century. Carpenter was also interested in the writings of historian Margaret Murray and occultist Gerald Gardner, and incorporated some of their ideas about witchcraft into the scripts.

== Summary ==
The premise in the first episode is that an 11th-century bumbling wizard named Catweazle (Geoffrey Bayldon) is pursued by soldiers through a wood, carrying only his magic charm and his toad familiar. He says a spell as he jumps into a pond. When he emerges from the pond he believes that he has flown from the woods; in fact he has jumped 900 years into the future.

Catweazle arrives on a farm in rural England in the year 1969 and befriends a farmer's son, a ginger teenager named Edward Bennet, nicknamed Carrot (Robin Davies), who spends most of the rest of the series attempting to hide Catweazle from his father (Bud Tingwell) and the farmhand Sam (Neil McCarthy). Catweazle searches for a way to return to his own time while hiding in a disused water tower on abandoned Ministry of Defence land, which he calls Castle Saburac, with the toad called Touchwood (as touching wood is believed to bring good fortune). Whenever he is spotted, he uses his magic amulet to hypnotize people into forgetting that they saw him.

The second series featured a 12-part riddle that Catweazle, now in 1970, attempts to solve at the rate of one clue per episode, the solution (as he thinks) being revealed in the 13th.

A third series, which was apparently to be set on the Bennets' farm from the first series rather than the stately home of the second series, never got past the drafting stage.

Catweazle mistakes all modern technology for powerful magic (an example of Arthur C. Clarke's third law that "Any sufficiently advanced technology is indistinguishable from magic"), particularly "elec-trickery" (electricity) and the "telling bone" (telephone). Often he tries spells that fail and then sighs, "Nothing works". Feeling flushed with success in the final episode, his last words are "Everything works, Touchwood! Everything works!".

Both series were shot on 16mm film. The first series was mostly shot on location at Home Farm, Ripley Road, East Clandon, (near Guildford) in Surrey, England in 1969. The second was mostly filmed around the Bayford/Brickendon area of Hertfordshire in 1970 (S02E12 shows scenes of Brickendon and near Bayford station). Interior scenes were filmed at (the now defunct) Halliford Studios, Manygate Lane, near Shepperton.

Both series centred on the relationship between Catweazle and the young lad from the present day who quickly accepts Catweazle as a friend. The second series had a more farcical character than the first. In the plaster fight scene in the episode 'The Enchanted King'. Cedric's parents were slightly unhinged gentry living in their family stately home. Almost all characters seemed out of touch with reality except Cedric. In the second series, Catweazle sings/speaks to himself using the series theme tune.

Although Bayldon thought the story had run its course after two series, he still praised the second, commenting that two episodes were, in his view, below standard, but not written by Carpenter; "There are two episodes I felt that with; the rest I think are lovely. I thought they were dreadful, but they were not written by Richard. They were written when we were behind".

The series won the Writers' Guild of Great Britain award for Best Children's TV Drama Script in 1971.

== Series 1 ==
The series appeared on television for the first time on Sunday, 4 January 1970 in the Netherlands, broadcast by the NOS. It was originally shown in the UK between Sunday, 15 February 1970 and Sunday, 10 May 1970 at 17:30–18:00 in most regions.

=== Cast ===
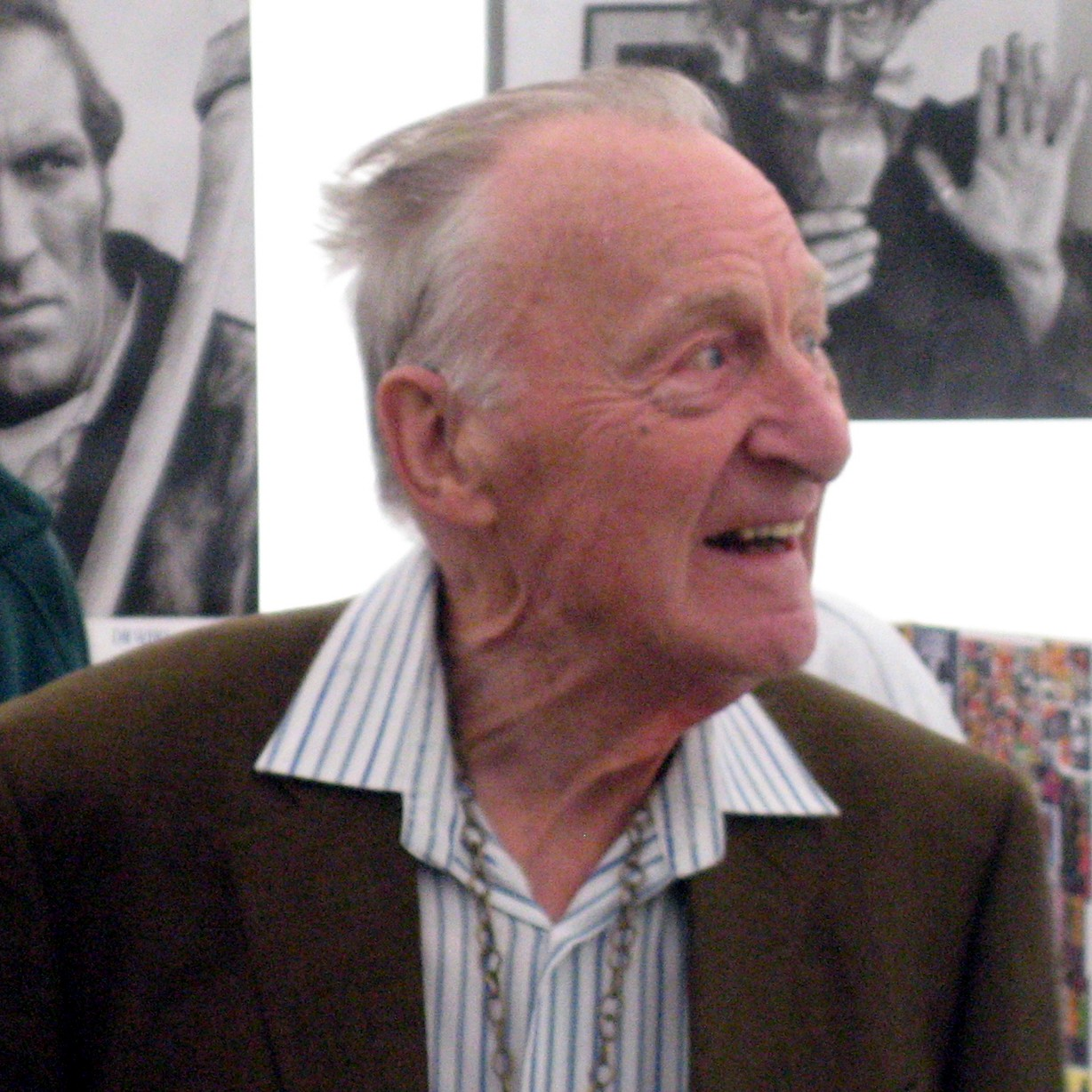
Geoffrey Bayldon (2009), Catweazle with "elec-trickery" in his hand behind him.

=== Main characters ===
- Catweazle: Geoffrey Bayldon
- Edward Bennet (Carrot): Robin Davies
- Mr Bennet: Charles "Bud" Tingwell
- Sam Woodyard: Neil McCarthy

=== Other characters ===
- Theda Watkins: Marjie Lawrence (episode 2)
- Stuffy Gladstone: Peter Sallis (e3)
- Miss Arthur: Anne Jameson (e3)
- Miss Bonnington: June Jago (e4)
- Miss Willoughby: Ruth Kettlewell (e4)
- Audrey: Carmel Cryan (e4)
- Doris: Ursula Smith (e4)
- Madam Rosa: Hattie Jacques (e5)
- Albert: Ellis Dale (e5)
- Woman at bus stop: Betty Woolfe (e5)
- Mrs Derringer: Marcella Markham (e6)
- Maud: Zulema Dene (e6)
- The Vicar: Brian Wilde (e7)
- Mrs Woodyard: Hazel Coppen (e7)
- Wilkins: Harry Hutchinson (e7)
- Leslie Milton: Aubrey Morris (e8)
- Fred: David Ellison (e8)
- Dick: Andrew Bradford (e8)
- Colonel Upshaw: Peter Butterworth (e9)
- Miss Coote: Dorothy Frere (e9)
- Cyril Fitton: Bernard Hepton (e10)
- Sergeant Bottle: John Junkin (e11)
- Charley: John Tordoff (e11)
- Mrs Skinner: Patricia Hayes (e12)
- Arthur: Freddy Foote (e12)
- Aunty Flo: Hilda Braid (e13)
- Dr Jane Matthews: Eileen Moore (e13)

=== Director ===
- Quentin Lawrence

=== Episodes ===
1. The Sun in a Bottle (15 February 1970)
2. Castle Saburac (22 February 1970)
3. The Curse of Rapkyn (1 March 1970)
4. The Witching Hour (8 March 1970)
5. The Eye of Time (15 March 1970)
6. The Magic Face (22 March 1970)
7. The Telling Bone (29 March 1970)
8. The Power of Adamcos (5 April 1970)
9. The Demi Devil (12 April 1970)
10. The House of the Sorcerer (19 April 1970)
11. The Flying Broomsticks (26 April 1970)
12. The Wisdom of Solomon (3 May 1970)
13. The Trickery Lantern (10 May 1970)

== Series 2 ==
This series was originally shown between Sunday 10 January 1971 and Sunday 4 April 1971 at 17.35–18.05 (all ITV regions except for ATV, the franchise holder in the Midlands.)

The series was more an echo than a continuation of series 1, and apart from Catweazle himself, all characters were new. Peter Butterworth who appeared in one episode in series 1 appeared as a more continual character (in a new role) in series 2.

Catweazle's home in series 2 was an abandoned railway building at "Duck Halt". His child contact this time is Cedric, an only child living in a very large mansion house.

=== Main characters ===
- Catweazle: Geoffrey Bayldon
- Cedric Collingford (aka Owlface): Gary Warren
- Lord Collingford: Moray Watson
- Lady Collingford (Dottie Darling): Elspet Gray
- (Henry) Groome: Peter Butterworth
- Mrs Gowdie: Gwen Nelson

=== Other characters ===
- Stuffy Gladstone: Peter Sallis (episode 1)
- Pickle: Bill Owen (episode 2)
- Publican: Jerold Wells (episode 2)
- Vandanti the Magician: Paul Eddington (episode 3)
- Inspector Pugh: Derek Francis (episode 4)
- Tearful Ted: Ronald Lacey (episode 4)
- Policeman: Tim Pearce (episode 4)
- Doctor Hawkins: Jonathan Elsom (episode 5)
- Jack Victor: Kenneth Cope (episode 6)
- Richardson: Tony Caunter (episode 6)
- John Gobling: Graham Crowden (episode 7)
- TV story teller: Peter Bayliss (episode 7)
- Mayor: Richard Caldicot (episode 7)
- Professors Oscar & Otto Habbleman: John Ringham (episode 8)
- Mrs Hannah Habbleman: Hana Maria Pravda (episode 8)
- Hackforth: David Cook (writer) (episode 9)
- Hector Kenley: Dudley Foster (episode 9)
- Colonel Arnold Dickenson: John Welsh (episode 10)
- Sgt Jones: Tony Selby (episode 10)
- Archie Goodwin: Arthur Lovegrove (episode 11)
- Dr Benjamin Wenik Derek Godfrey (episode 12)
- Boris: Roger Hammond (episode 13)

=== Directors ===
- David Reid (7 episodes)
- David Lane (6 episodes)

=== Episodes ===
1. The Magic Riddle (10 January 1971)
2. Duck Halt (17 January 1971)
3. The Heavenly Twins (24 January 1971)
4. The Sign of the Crab (31 January 1971)
5. The Black Wheels (7 February 1971)
6. The Wogle Stone (14 February 1971)
7. The Enchanted King (21 February 1971)
8. The Familiar Spirit (28 February 1971)
9. The Ghost Hunters (7 March 1971)
10. The Walking Trees (14 March 1971)
11. The Battle of the Giants (21 March 1971)
12. The Magic Circle (28 March 1971)
13. The Thirteenth Sign (4 April 1971)

== Critical reception ==
Reviewing Catweazle for Starburst magazine, Richard Hollis described Catweazle as "an exceptionally well-made series and a worthy example of British television fantasy". Television historians Alistair McGown and Mark Docherty wrote that "Catweazle became a highly respected children's series in its time".

== Home media ==
In the 1980s, Carpenter announced that he hoped to adapt Catweazle into a feature film. However, the planned film was never produced.

A Catweazle film was made in Germany in 2021. It is considered faithful to the storyline. It is available with English subtitles.

Both series of Catweazle were released on VHS in 1998.

The first series was released on Region 2 DVD in the UK in May 2005, with a short reunion documentary "Brothers in Magic" and audio commentaries on selected episodes by Carpenter, Bayldon, Davies and Executive Producer Joy Whitby. The second series was released in August 2005.

In Australia Catweazle: The Complete Series was released in May 2007. In June 2011 both series were released in Region 4.

On 29 March 2010 the series was re-released in the UK to commemorate its 40th anniversary. Among several other additional features were a "Westbourne Museum" image gallery (named after a small local museum in the episode "The Curse of Rapkyn" starring Peter Sallis) featuring the most comprehensive collection of original Catweazle memorabilia and promotional ephemera ever assembled, sourced from The Paul Pert Screen Collection. The release of the 40th Anniversary Special Edition DVD set was also accompanied by a commemorative publication, The Magic Book by Simon Wells and Paul Pert. Robin Davies (who had played Carrot) died just before its publication, on 22 February 2010, at the age of 56. The publication includes an article by Pert about the longevity of the Catweazle phenomenon, entitled "A Magical Spell in the Countryside," which contains Robin Davies's last recorded comments about the series that made him a star and about his special friendship with Bayldon. The DVD image gallery also recorded the occasion of their last meeting at an annual commemorative event held at the farm in East Clandon, Surrey, where the first series was filmed in the summer of 1969.

Also featured in the article was an interview with Richard Carpenter in which he gave a frank account of his thoughts on modern television, and again expressed his desire to bring his writing career full circle with a Catweazle film for the 21st century. He also confirmed that he had drafted a new script. Negotiations for a film had reached pre-production stages when Carpenter died while walking his dog in the countryside at the age of 82 on 26 February 2012.

The first episode of the first series is available to view in full for registered users at the BFI Screenonline site.

The full series was shown on the UK free-to-air television channel Talking Pictures TV from Saturday 2 November 2019.

== Books ==
There are two novelisations by Carpenter, one for each series: Catweazle (1970) and Catweazle and the Magic Zodiac (1971). Both books were illustrated by George Adamson. A 20-page picture book, Catweazle in Marrow Escape was also produced, written by Alan Fennell. A comic strip version featured in the TV comic Look-in, written by Angus P. Allan, and three annuals were also released by World, from 1970 to 1972.

== Film ==
A German film adaptation of the series was released in June 2021, featuring German comedian Otto Waalkes as Catweazle. The film was mostly shot on location at Eberbach Abbey and Stolberg (Kupferhof Rosenthal, primary school Grüntalstraße, Oldtown) and the Katzensteine between Mechernich and Satzvey Castle.

== Legacy ==
English professional wrestler Gary Cooper (1939-1992) adopted the ring name "Catweazle" and a similar image to the title character of the programme. Signed to Joint Promotions, he appeared regularly on the wrestling slot of World of Sport, including Mick McManus' retirement match in 1982.
