= Louis Loeffler =

American film editor (1897–1972)

Louis R. Loeffler
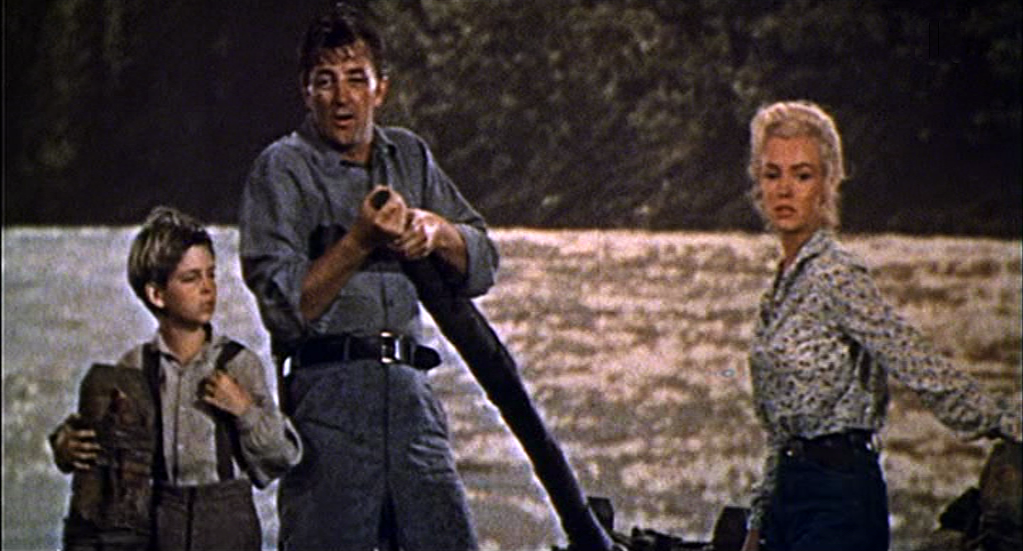
- Born: February 24, 1897; New York City, United States
- Died: April 22, 1972 (aged 75); Hollywood, Los Angeles, California, United States
- Occupation: Film editor

Louis R. Loeffler (February 24, 1897 – April 22, 1972) was an American film editor. Through his five-decade career, he worked on over 100 films, including In Old Arizona (1928), Hotel for Women (1939), In the Meantime, Darling (1944), Laura (1944), The Iron Curtain (1948), How to Marry a Millionaire (1953), River of No Return (1954), and Anatomy of a Murder (1959). He was nominated for two Academy Awards for film editing in 1960 and 1963 for the films Anatomy of a Murder and The Cardinal, respectively.

== Filmography ==
Editor
Year	Film	Director	Notes	Other notes
1927	Chain Lightning	Lambert Hillyer		
1928	The Red Dance	Raoul Walsh	First collaboration with Raoul Walsh	
1928	Me, Gangster	Raoul Walsh	Second collaboration with Raoul Walsh	
1928	In Old Arizona	Irving Cummings; Raoul Walsh	Third collaboration with Raoul Walsh	
1929	Thru Different Eyes	John G. Blystone	First collaboration with John G. Blystone	
1930	One Mad Kiss	Marcel Silver; James Tinling	First collaboration with James Tinling	
1930	Del Mismo Barro	David Howard		
1930	Lightnin'	Henry King		
1932	Amateur Daddy	John G. Blystone	Second collaboration with John G. Blystone	
1932	Week Ends Only	Alan Crosland		
1933	Pilgrimage	John Ford	First collaboration with John Ford	Uncredited
1933	Arizona to Broadway	James Tinling	Second collaboration with James Tinling	
1933	Doctor Bull	John Ford	Second collaboration with John Ford	
1935	Your Uncle Dudley	Eugene Forde	First collaboration with Eugene Forde	
1936	Here Comes Trouble	Lewis Seiler	First collaboration with Lewis Seiler	
1936	Human Cargo	Allan Dwan	First collaboration with Allan Dwan	
1936	Educating Father	James Tinling	Third collaboration with James Tinling	
1936	High Tension	Allan Dwan	Second collaboration with Allan Dwan	
1936	36 Hours to Kill	Eugene Forde	Second collaboration with Eugene Forde	
1936	Can This Be Dixie?	George Marshall	First collaboration with George Marshall	
1936	Career Woman	Lewis Seiler	Second collaboration with Lewis Seiler	
1937	Fair Warning	Norman Foster	First collaboration with Norman Foster	
1937	That I May Live	Allan Dwan	Third collaboration with Allan Dwan	
1937	She Had to Eat	Malcolm St. Clair		
1937	Life Begins in College	William A. Seiter		
1937	Lancer Spy	Gregory Ratoff	First collaboration with Gregory Ratoff	
1938	Happy Landing	Roy Del Ruth	First collaboration with Roy Del Ruth	
1938	Four Men and a Prayer	John Ford	Third collaboration with John Ford	
1938	I'll Give a Million	Walter Lang	First collaboration with Walter Lang	
1938	Hold That Co-Ed	George Marshall	Second collaboration with George Marshall	
1939	The Little Princess	Walter Lang	Second collaboration with Walter Lang	
1939	Rose of Washington Square	Gregory Ratoff	Second collaboration with Gregory Ratoff	
1939	Hotel for Women	Gregory Ratoff	Third collaboration with Gregory Ratoff	
1939	Here I Am a Stranger	Roy Del Ruth	Second collaboration with Roy Del Ruth	
1939	Swanee River	Sidney Lanfield		
1940	Girl in 313	Ricardo Cortez		
1940	Earthbound	Irving Pichel	First collaboration with Irving Pichel	
1940	Girl from Avenue A	Otto Brower		
1940	Murder Over New York	Harry Lachman		
1941	Ride, Kelly, Ride	Norman Foster	Second collaboration with Norman Foster	
1941	Ride on Vaquero	Herbert I. Leeds	First collaboration with Herbert I. Leeds	
1941	Dance Hall	Irving Pichel	Second collaboration with Irving Pichel	
1941	Marry the Boss's Daughter	Thornton Freeland		
1942	Right to the Heart	Eugene Forde	Third collaboration with Eugene Forde	
1942	Young America	Louis King		
1942	Who Is Hope Schuyler?	Thomas Z. Loring	First collaboration with Thomas Z. Loring	
1942	Thru Different Eyes	Thomas Z. Loring	Second collaboration with Thomas Z. Loring	
1942	Just Off Broadway	Herbert I. Leeds	Second collaboration with Herbert I. Leeds	
1942	Quiet Please, Murder	John Larkin		
1943	Margin for Error	Otto Preminger	First collaboration with Otto Preminger	
1943	The Moon Is Down	Irving Pichel	Third collaboration with Irving Pichel	
1943	He Hired the Boss	Thomas Z. Loring	Third collaboration with Thomas Z. Loring	
1943	Wintertime	John Brahm		
1944	The Fighting Sullivans	Lloyd Bacon	First collaboration with Lloyd Bacon	
1944	In the Meantime, Darling	Otto Preminger	Second collaboration with Otto Preminger	
1944	Laura	Otto Preminger	Third collaboration with Otto Preminger	
1945	Caesar and Cleopatra	Gabriel Pascal		Uncredited
1946	Home Sweet Homicide	Lloyd Bacon	Second collaboration with Lloyd Bacon	
1947	I Wonder Who's Kissing Her Now	Lloyd Bacon	Third collaboration with Lloyd Bacon	
1947	Forever Amber	Otto Preminger	Fourth collaboration with Otto Preminger	
1947	Daisy Kenyon	Otto Preminger	Fifth collaboration with Otto Preminger	
1948	The Iron Curtain	William A. Wellman		
1948	That Wonderful Urge	Robert B. Sinclair		
1949	The Fan	Otto Preminger	Sixth collaboration with Otto Preminger	
1949	Oh, You Beautiful Doll	John M. Stahl		
1949	Dancing in the Dark	Irving Reis		
1950	Whirlpool	Otto Preminger	Seventh collaboration with Otto Preminger	
1950	Where the Sidewalk Ends	Otto Preminger	Eighth collaboration with Otto Preminger	
1950	Two Flags West	Robert Wise		
1951	The 13th Letter	Otto Preminger	Ninth collaboration with Otto Preminger	
1951	Call Me Mister	Lloyd Bacon	Fourth collaboration with Lloyd Bacon	
1951	Golden Girl	Lloyd Bacon	Fifth collaboration with Lloyd Bacon	
1952	Return of the Texan	Delmer Daves		
1952	Down Among the Sheltering Palms	Edmund Goulding	First collaboration with Edmund Goulding	
1952	We're Not Married!	Edmund Goulding	Second collaboration with Edmund Goulding	
1952	My Cousin Rachel	Henry Koster		
1953	The I Don't Care Girl	Lloyd Bacon	Sixth collaboration with Lloyd Bacon	
1953	Titanic	Jean Negulesco	First collaboration with Jean Negulesco	
1953	The Farmer Takes a Wife	Henry Levin		
1953	How to Marry a Millionaire	Jean Negulesco	Second collaboration with Jean Negulesco	
1954	River of No Return	Otto Preminger	Tenth collaboration with Otto Preminger	
1954	Woman's World	Jean Negulesco	Third collaboration with Jean Negulesco	
1954	Carmen Jones	Otto Preminger	Eleventh collaboration with Otto Preminger	
1955	Violent Saturday	Richard Fleischer		
1955	How to Be Very, Very Popular	Nunnally Johnson	First collaboration with Nunnally Johnson	
1955	The Tall Men	Raoul Walsh	Fourth collaboration with Raoul Walsh	
1955	The Man with the Golden Arm	Otto Preminger	Twelfth collaboration with Otto Preminger	
1956	The Revolt of Mamie Stover	Raoul Walsh	Fifth collaboration with Raoul Walsh	
1956	Bigger Than Life	Nicholas Ray		
1956	The King and Four Queens	Raoul Walsh	Sixth collaboration with Raoul Walsh	
1957	The Wayward Bus	Victor Vicas		
1957	No Down Payment	Martin Ritt	First collaboration with Martin Ritt	
1958	The Long, Hot Summer	Martin Ritt	Second collaboration with Martin Ritt	
1958	A Certain Smile	Jean Negulesco	Fourth collaboration with Jean Negulesco	
1958	Rally Round the Flag, Boys!	Leo McCarey		
1959	Anatomy of a Murder	Otto Preminger	Thirteenth collaboration with Otto Preminger	
1959	Hound-Dog Man	Don Siegel		
1960	The Angel Wore Red	Nunnally Johnson	Second collaboration with Nunnally Johnson	
1960	Exodus	Otto Preminger	Fourteenth collaboration with Otto Preminger	
1961	Francis of Assisi	Michael Curtiz	First collaboration with Michael Curtiz	
1961	The Comancheros	Michael Curtiz	Second collaboration with Michael Curtiz	
1962	Advise & Consent	Otto Preminger	Fifteenth collaboration with Otto Preminger	
1963	The Cardinal	Otto Preminger	Sixteenth collaboration with Otto Preminger	
1964	Shock Treatment	Denis Sanders		
1964	The Pleasure Seekers	Jean Negulesco	Fifth collaboration with Jean Negulesco	
1967	Hurry Sundown	Otto Preminger	Seventeenth collaboration with Otto Preminger	

Editorial department
Year	Film	Director	Role
1956	The King and Four Queens	Raoul Walsh	Supervising editor

Director
Year	Film	Notes
1930	The Big Trail	Uncredited
1931	Il Grande Sentiero	

Special effects
Year	Film	Director	Role	Notes
1940	Foreign Correspondent	Alfred Hitchcock	Special effects cutter	Uncredited

TV series

Editor
Year	Title	Notes
1959	Adventures in Paradise	1 episode
1964	Daniel Boone	1 episode
