= Sword of Sherwood Forest =

1960 British film by Terence Fisher

- Theatrical release poster
- Directed by: Terence Fisher
- Written by: Alan Hackney
- Produced by: Sidney Cole; Richard Greene; Michael Carreras
- Starring: Richard Greene; Sarah Branch; Peter Cushing; Niall MacGinnis; Nigel Green; Oliver Reed; Desmond Llewellyn
- Cinematography: Ken Hodges; Richard Bayley
- Edited by: James Needs; Lee Doig
- Music by: Alun Hoddinott; John Hollingsworth; Stanley Black (songs)
- Production company: Hammer Film Productions
- Distributed by: Columbia Pictures
- Release date: 26 December 1960; (UK)
- Running time: 80 minutes
- Country: United Kingdom
- Language: English
- Box office: 1,229,879 admissions (France)

Sword of Sherwood Forest is a 1960 British Technicolor/MegaScope adventure film directed by Terence Fisher and starring Richard Greene, Peter Cushing, Niall MacGinnis, Nigel Green and Sarah Branch. Greene reprises the role of Robin Hood that he had played in The Adventures of Robin Hood television series from 1955 to 1959. The film was coproduced by Greene, Sidney Cole and Michael Carreras for Hammer Film Productions.

The film was shot in both England and Ireland, from 23 May 1960 until 8 July. It was released in the UK on 26 December 1960 and in the United States in January 1961.

== Review ==
The Sheriff of Nottingham plans to confiscate the estate of the Lord of Bawtry, a nobleman who has died on a crusade. The archbishop of Canterbury, acting as regent or viceroy on behalf of King Richard the Lionheart (who is also on a crusade), speaks against the plan and the sheriff plots to eliminate him. Robin Hood is asked to kill the archbishop for the plotters, led by the Earl of Newark and Lord Melton, but when he realises who the intended target is, Robin Hood resolves to help the archbishop instead.

Maid Marian also wants to meet the archbishop so that she can grant freedom to the family of a man murdered by the sheriff's men. She also wishes to meet Robin again, whom she had believed to be a common outlaw before realising that he is on the side of good.

== Cast ==
- Richard Greene as Robin Hood
- Peter Cushing as the Sheriff of Nottingham
- Niall MacGinnis as Friar Tuck
- Sarah Branch as Maid Marian
- Richard Pasco as Edward, Earl of Newark
- Jack Gwillim as Archbishop Hubert Walter
- Nigel Green as Little John
- Vanda Godsell as the Prioress
- Edwin Richfield as the Sheriff's Lieutenant
- Charles Lamb as Old Bowyer
- Dennis Lotis as Alan A'Dale
- Oliver Reed as the Lord Melton (uncredited)
- Patrick Crean as Lord Ollerton (uncredited)
- Derren Nesbitt as Martin of Eastwood (uncredited)
- Desmond Llewellyn as wounded fugitive (uncredited)
- John Hoey as Old Jack (uncredited)
- Anew McMaster as Judge (uncredited)
- James Neylin as Roger (uncredited)
- Brian Rawlinson as falconer (uncredited)
- Reginald Hearne as Man-at-Arms (uncredited)

Apart from Greene, none of the original cast from The Adventures of Robin Hood appears in the film.

== Production ==
While most Hammer Film Productions films of the period were filmed at the company's permanent home at Bray Studios, Sword of Sherwood Forest was produced at Ardmore Studios in Bray, and at County Wicklow in Ireland.

The film's music was composed by Alun Hoddinott, with songs by Stanley Black.

== Reception ==
In a contemporary review for The New York Times, critic Howard Thompson wrote: "It's business as usual, but hold on. Alan Hackney's script and Terence Fisher's direction keep the incidents jouncing ... a nicely tinted Sherwood Forest is as pretty as could be, and Sarah Branch is certainly the curviest Lady Marian we've ever seen. Mr. Greene is aptly limber, and Peter Cushing, Richard Pasco and an unidentified "Archbishop of Canterbury" are excellent".

The Monthly Film Bulletin wrote: "Lush Irish landscapes, doing service for Nottinghamshire's medieval green belt, and the presence of two solitary actors, Richard Pasco and Jack Gwillim, fail to save this joyless romp. Pantomimic dialogue, a sprawling plot and a rouged and lipsticked Prioress are but three of the hazards common to this type of film; a needless flogging scene, and the flea-bitten costumes and performances of the small-part players, are more damaging and unpleasant elements in a tradition that remains specifically Hammer's."

The Radio Times Guide to Films gave the film 2/5 stars, writing: "To many, Richard Greene was the definitive Robin Hood, ushering in ITV in a cleverly cast (though cheaply made) television series with a remarkably catchy theme tune. This is the feature, co-produced by Greene for Hammer Films. Alan Wheatley makes way for Peter Cushing as the villainous Sheriff of Nottingham, and the film is directed by Cushing's Hammer colleague, Terence Fisher. Technicolor adds some scale, but this is really a cheap and cheerful affair."

British film critic Leslie Halliwell said: "The big-screen version of a popular TV series makes a rather feeble addition to the legend, but the actors try hard."

== See also ==
- List of films and television series featuring Robin Hood
