= Afghan coat =

Coat made with the fleece on the inside and the soft leather on the outside

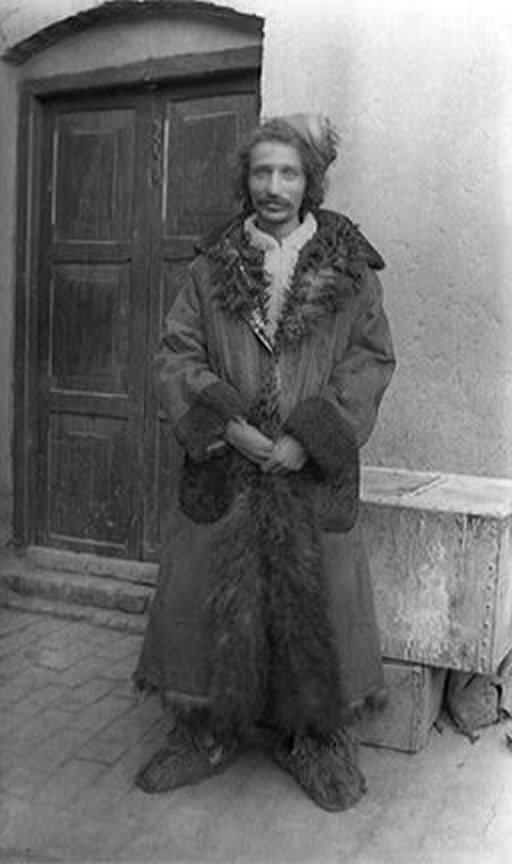
Meher Baba in an Afghan coat, Quetta, 1923

An Afghan coat is a sheepskin or goatskin coat made with the fleece on the inside and the soft suede-like leather on the outside. It is a development of the traditional overcoat of the Afghan people, which could be anywhere from jacket- to ankle-length, with full or partial sleeves.

Afghan coats originate from Ghazni province, situated between Kabul and Kandahar by the Pashtun people. The coats are made from sheepskins that have been cured and tanned, and were often colourful and finely embroidered with silk thread. They are ideal for the climate in Afghanistan, which is cold and severe in the winter.

The Afghan coats were first imported to the United Kingdom in 1966 by Craig Sams, who sold them through hippie boutiques including Granny Takes a Trip on London's King's Road. The Beatles visited the shop and emerged wearing the coats. Photographs of them in Afghan coats appeared in print media. They also wore them, inside out, for the cover picture of the Magical Mystery Tour LP. Demand took off and the artisanal makers of Ghazni could not keep up. Crude imitations flooded the market. In 2009–10, John Lennon's coat was on display in an exhibition of the Julian Lennon Collection.

Imitations of the original design continued to be very popular in the 1970s and 1980s particularly associated with the hippie subculture.

== Gallery ==
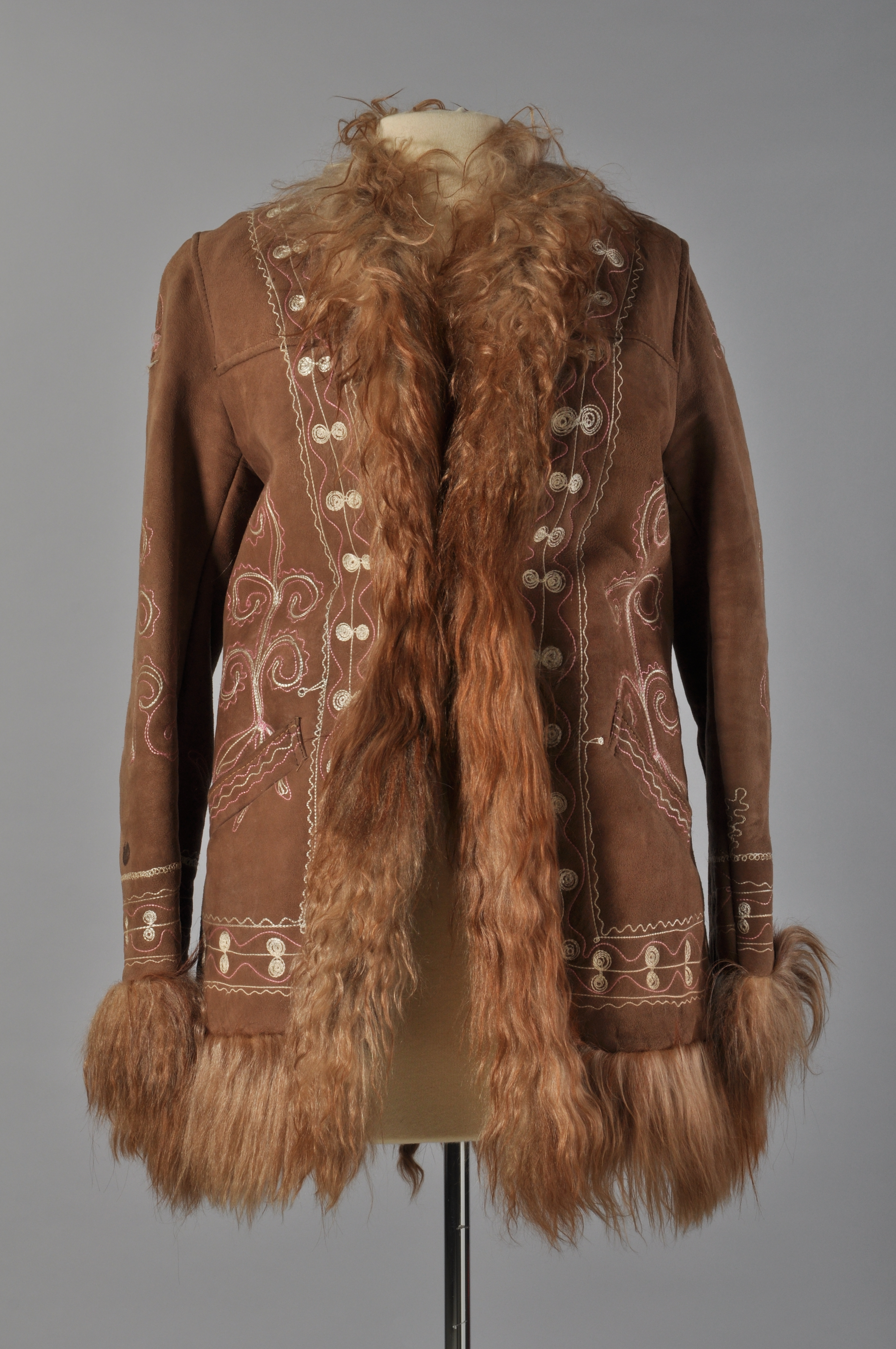

== See also ==
- Afghan clothing
