= Susie Ione Brown Waxwood =

American clubwoman

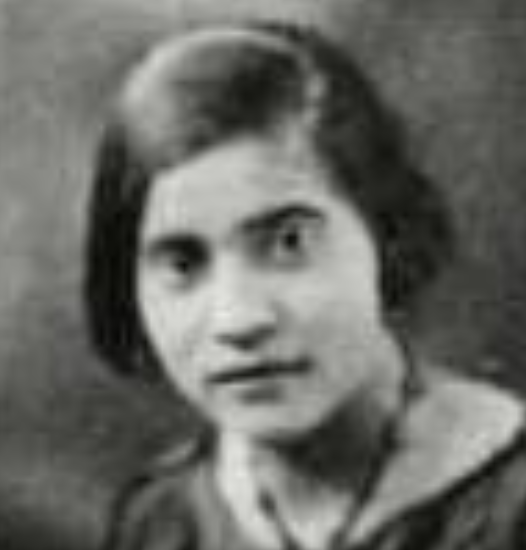
- Susie Ione Brown, from the 1925 yearbook of Howard University
- Born: September 12, 1902; Gray, Louisiana
- Died: January 30, 2006 (aged 103); Plainsboro Township, New Jersey
- Occupations: Philanthropist, clubwoman

Susie Ione Brown Waxwood (September 12, 1902 – January 30, 2006) was an American philanthropist and clubwoman, based in Princeton, New Jersey.

== Early life and education ==
Susie Ione Brown was from Gray, Louisiana, the daughter of John D. Brown and Elizabeth Saulsby Brown. Her parents were teachers; her father also worked in insurance. Her brother Russell Wilfred Brown was a medical researcher and professor at Tuskegee Institute. She went to high school in New Orleans. She graduated from Howard University in 1925, and was a member of the Alpha Kappa Alpha sorority.

== Career ==
After college, in 1927, Brown was one of the charter members of Alpha Beta Omega chapter of Alpha Kappa Alpha in New Orleans, the first Black "Greek Letter" sorority in Louisiana. She later served as president of the chapter.

After moving to New Jersey in 1935, Waxwood was involved with the Red Cross during World War II, and worked to integrate the organization's blood bank in the 1940s. She was executive director of the Princeton YWCA from 1958 to 1968, the branch's first Black director. She was acting executive director of the Montclair-North Essex YWCA from 1969 to 1971. In 1998 she worked for the Princeton YWCA's endowment campaign. The Princeton YWCA awards an annual Waxwood Lifetime Award, named in her honor in 1999.

Waxwood helped found the Princeton Adult School and the Witherspoon Federal Credit Union. She served on the board of directors for the Princeton Nursery School, and was active with the Princeton Regional Scholarship Foundation. She was active in the NAACP Legal Defense Fund, and a charter member of the Central New Jersey chapter of The Links. She was named Soroptimist Woman of the Year in 1977.

Waxwood was active in the Witherspoon Street Presbyterian Church beginning in 1942. She was ordained as an elder and was president of the Women's Association. She helped start the Princeton Crisis Ministry there. She represented New Jersey at the White House Conference on Aging, and she chaired the Mercer County Office on Aging. An apartment complex was named the Waxwood after her husband, at the site of his former school, and she attended the dedication. She donated a collection of Witherspoon Street School materials to the Historical Society of Princeton.

In 2003, when she was 100 years old, she visited a kindergarten class in Tryon, North Carolina, to help them mark the 100th day of school. "I can remember the first time I saw a telephone, light bulb and gracious me, an automobile," she told the children. "It was a Ford and my oldest brother learned how to drive it in the pasture. I think he frightened the cows."

== Personal life and legacy ==
Brown married scientist and educator Howard B. Waxwood Jr. in 1929. He died in 1977. They had a son, Howard B. Waxwood III, who died in 1979. She moved to Tryon, North Carolina in 2002 to live near her granddaughter, and died in Plainsboro, New Jersey in 2006, aged 103 years. Her portrait hangs in the lobby of the Princeton YWCA, and her birthday is still marked with a canned goods drive by the Princeton Crisis Ministry. The Waxwoods were honored as "Unsung Heroes" at Princeton's Community House in 2007, and featured in a coloring book published for Martin Luther King Jr. Day in 2021.
