= Betsey Stockton =

American educator and missionary (1798–1865)

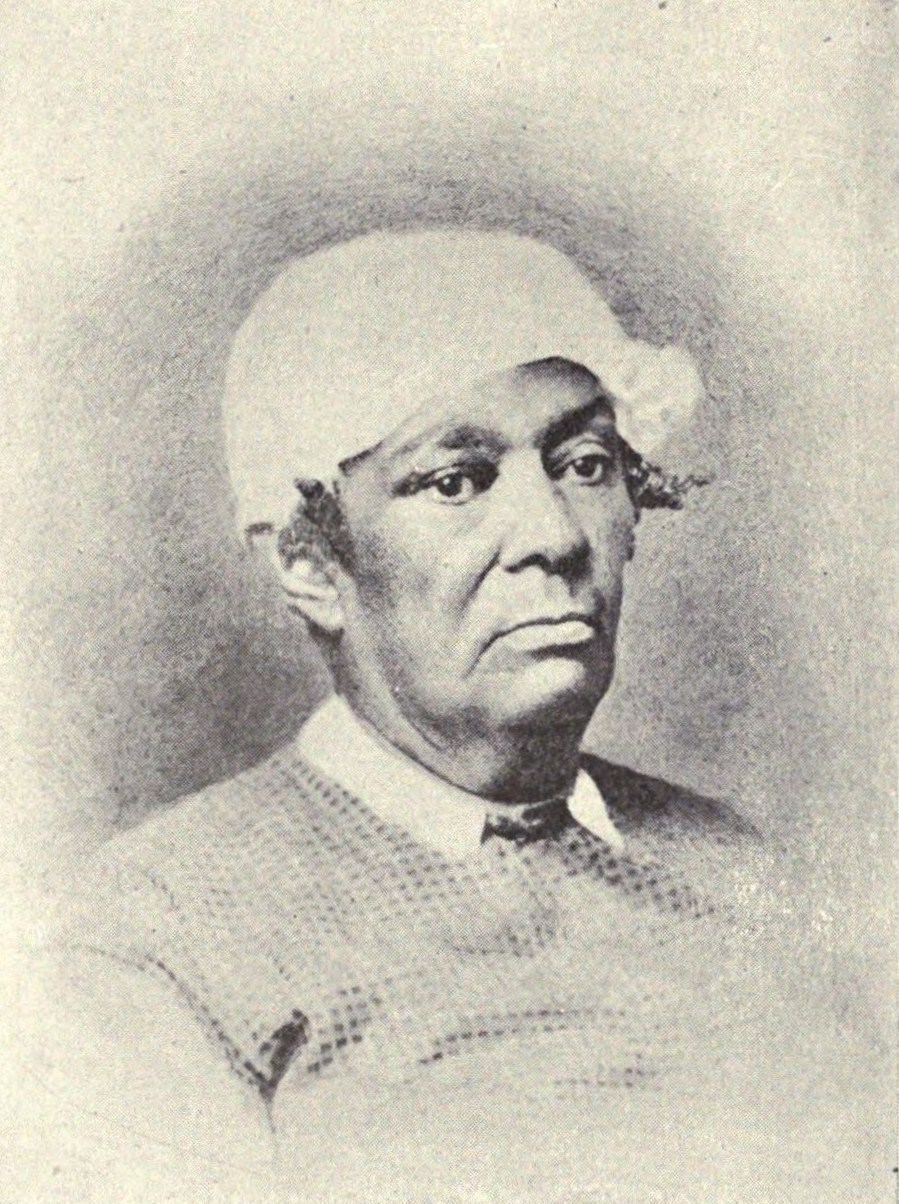
- Betsey Stockton, circa 1863
- Born: c. 1798; Princeton, New Jersey, US
- Died: October 24, 1865; Princeton, New Jersey, US
- Resting place: Cooperstown, New York, US
- Occupations: Educator and Missionary

Betsey Stockton (c. 1798 – 1865), sometimes spelled Betsy Stockton, was an American educator and missionary. In her early life, she was an enslaved person, but was emancipated and became a Christian missionary in Hawaii.

== Early life ==
Betsey was born into slavery in Princeton, New Jersey, during the year 1798. While she was a child, her owner Robert Stockton gave her to his daughter upon her marriage to Reverend Ashbel Green, president of the College of New Jersey (now Princeton University). Much of what is known of her earlier life comes from sporadic mentions of her in Green's diary; while useful, this source also reflects Green's assumption of control over the enslaved girl, often leaving out key details about her. When Green decided she needed further discipline, young Betsey was temporarily sent to labor in the household of Green's nephew, the Reverend Nathaniel Todd. The Todd household seemed a place Betsey was more able to flourish, but financial matters related to Todd's employment caused Betsey to return to Green's household in 1816.

Stockton decided to become a Christian during a revival meeting held by Eliphalet Wheeler Gilbert.

She gained her education from reading in Reverend Green's library. She eventually gained fluency to read religious and scholarly texts in several languages. She attended evening classes at Princeton and was studying at the university during the winter of 1815 when a revival broke out on campus; at this time she was granted her manumission by the Greens.

In 1817 she was admitted as a member of the First Presbyterian Church in Princeton. It appears she chose the surname of Stockton for herself, likely reflecting her own former enslavement by the white Stockton family, and perhaps also indicating her father or another paternal relative was a white Stockton.

She remained as a paid domestic servant with the family, and learned to read, perhaps with some instruction from Reverend Green's sons. A deeply religious person, she expressed a desire to go as a missionary to Africa.

== Missionary and educator ==
Betsey Stockton learned of plans by Charles S. Stewart, a student at Princeton Theological Seminary and friend of the Green family, to go to Hawaii (then known as the Sandwich Islands) as a missionary. She expressed a desire to go with him and his family, and Dr. Green and her Sabbath school teacher wrote letters of recommendation to the American Board of Commissioners for Foreign Missions. Stockton was commissioned by the Board as a missionary, and became the second single American woman (after Charlotte White) sent overseas as a missionary. Her contract with the Board and with the Stewarts said that she went "neither as an equal nor as a servant, but as a humble Christian friend" to the Stewarts, and provided that she was not to be more occupied with domestic duties than the other missionaries.

The team (which included William Richards) set sail on the ship "The Thames" from New Haven, Connecticut on November 22, 1822, for a five-month voyage. The Stewarts and Stockton settled at Lāhainā on Maui. Stockton was the first unmarried woman from the U.S. to travel to Hawai'i as a missionary (most women accompanied their husbands), as well as the first African American to serve as a missionary in Hawai'i. She was the teacher of the first mission school opened to the common (non-chiefly) people of Hawaii. where she taught history, English, Latin, and algebra. The current Lahaina Luna School is built on the site of Stockton’s school. Along with being a missionary and teacher, Stockton also served unofficially as a doctor and nurse to a number of people in Hawaii. She also trained native Hawaiian teachers, who took over from her upon her departure until the arrival of another missionary. She returned with the Stewarts to the U.S. in 1825 due to Harriet Stewart's poor health. A version of Stockton's Hawaiian diary was published in the Christian Advocate by Dr. Green in 1824 and 1825.

Stockton stayed with the Stewart household for four years and taught briefly at an infant school in Philadelphia, Pennsylvania. Missionary William Case then asked Green’s advice about asking Stockton to teach in Canada; she moved to Canada in May 1829 and established a school for Indians at Grape Island, Canada. After returning to Princeton in 1835, she taught in its school for people of color until her death on October 24, 1865. She taught at the Witherspoon Street School for Colored Children and was assessed as an "excellent teacher".

In 1835, the Presbyterian church building burnt down; the people of color attending the church decided to form their own congregation. In 1840, she helped found Princeton's First Presbyterian Church of Color, which in 1848 was renamed the Witherspoon Street Presbyterian Church.

She was buried in Cooperstown, New York alongside the Stewart family.

== Legacy ==
In 2018, Princeton University dedicated a garden in Stockton's memory.
