= Greg Sams =

American-British writer, artist (born 1948)

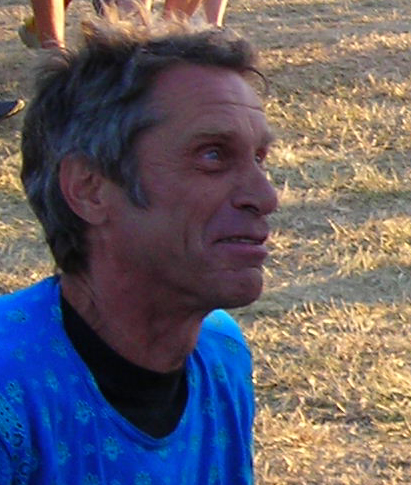
Gregory Sams at the Glade Festival in 2006.

Gregory Sams (born 1948 in Los Angeles, California) is a UK-based, American-born, fractal artist, author and publisher.

== Life and works ==
Greg has been a wheelchair user since falling from a tree whilst a freshman at the University of California, Berkeley.

Greg moved to London and, aged 19, then subsequently opened SEED, a macrobiotic restaurant in Paddington with his brother Craig Sams in 1968.

SEED Restaurant soon became popular with the 1960s London psychedelic scene, and was frequented by John Lennon among others, who drew a cartoon about his experiences at SEED.

The Sams brothers opened a specialised macrobiotic foodshop, Ceres Grain, the following year. To spread the word about Ceres and SEED, Greg published three editions of a specialised magazine called 'Harmony'. During the 1970s, Greg, his brother Craig and their father Ken edited and published a magazine called 'Seed, the Journal of Organic Living' over a seven-year period.

In 1970 Greg and Craig set up Harmony Foods, which eventually became known as Whole Earth Foods.

In 1982, Greg invented the first commercially produced veggie burger, which he christened VegeBurger and went on to become a worldwide success after the word “veggie” started entering the lexicon in the late 1970s.

In 1982, Greg left Whole Earth Foods with his brother who went on to become chairperson of the Soil Association, and develop Green & Blacks organic chocolate with his partner.

In 1990, Sams opened Strange Attractions in London, the only shop in the world dedicated to chaos theory. He became known for his fractal art, his designs adorning postcards, t-shirts and textiles all over the world. \\ An enthusiast of the counterculture movement, such as the non-violent direct action street reclaiming events in the UK and elsewhere such as Reclaim the Streets, Sams began writing books that were promoted at these events, as well as during various trance music, psytrance and acid techno raves and free parties around the UK. Uncommon Sense - the State is Out of Date was published in 1998 in which he put forward his views on the importance of chaos theory in the way we live - and should live - our lives. In 2006 he completed a new book, Sun of gOd - Discover the Self-Organizing Consciousness That Underlies Everything.

Sams has been a regular on the world music festival scene since he provided the macrobiotic catering at the first Glastonbury Festival, known as Glastonbury Fair in 1971. A regular of events such as Pendragon at the now defunct Tyssen Street Theatre Factory, he still travels to music festivals, solar eclipses, and festivals such as The Glade. He was interviewed on the Liquid Crystal Vision film which has been viewed at many festivals.

== Books ==
- The State is Out of Date, We Can do it Better, 4th edition 2014, ISBN 095313010X
- Sun of gOd - Discover the Self-Organizing Consciousness That Underlies Everything Spring 2009, Weiser Books, Graham Hancock (Foreword), ISBN 1578634547
