= Witherspoon Street School for Colored Children =

- U.S. National Register of Historic Places
- New Jersey Register of Historic Places
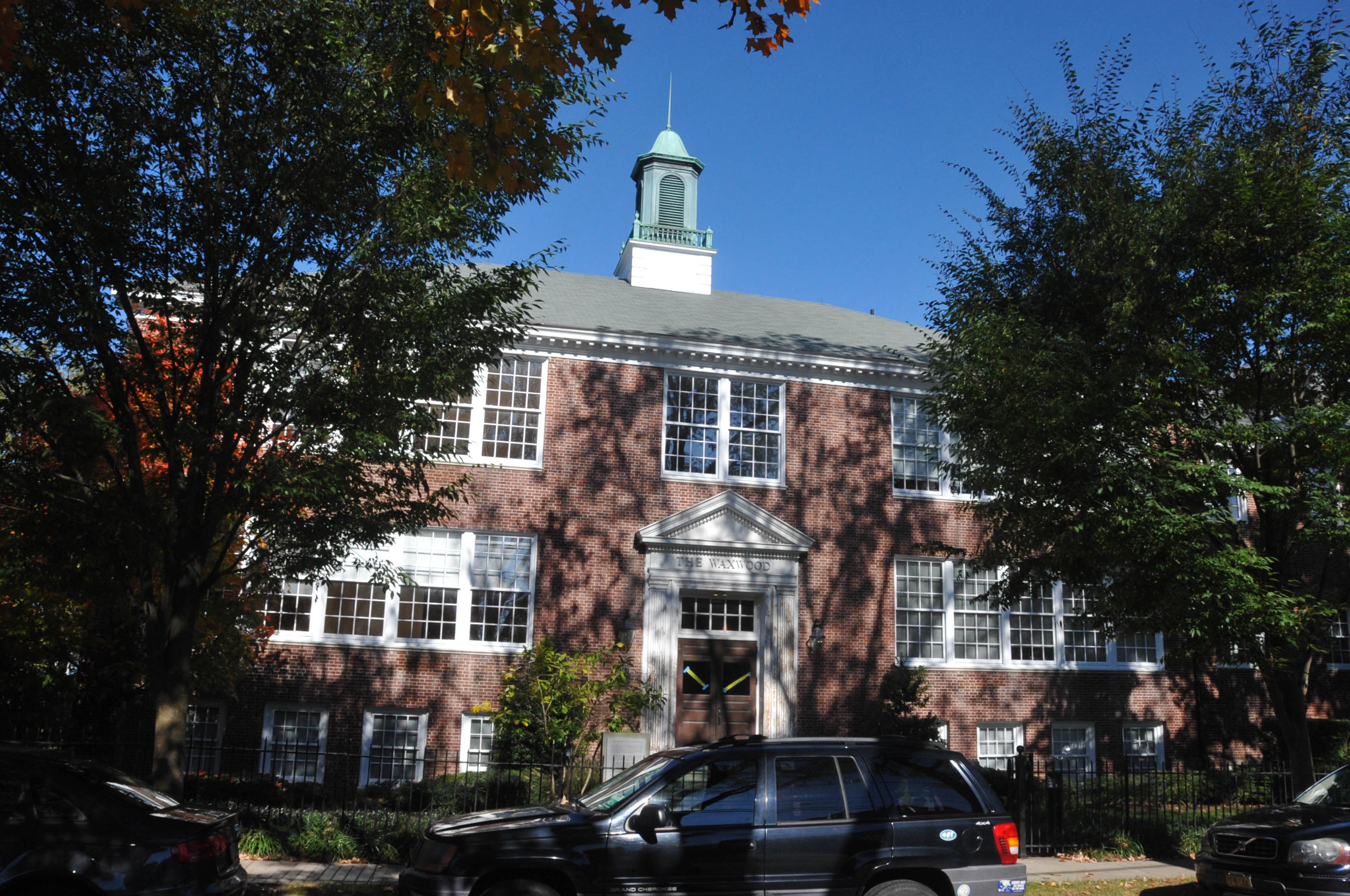
- The Quarry Street building of the Witherspoon School, now apartments

- Location within Mercer County, New Jersey Location within New Jersey Location within the United States
- Location: 35 Quarry Street, Princeton, New Jersey 08542
- Coordinates: 40°21′11.3″N 74°39′46.6″W
- Built: 1858 (184 Witherspoon); 1909 (35 Quarry Street)
- Architectural style: Colonial Revival
- NRHP reference No.: 05000125
- NJRHP No.: 4390

Significant dates
- Added to NRHP: March 9, 2005
- Designated NJRHP: January 6, 2005

The Witherspoon Street School for Colored Children educated the African-American children of Princeton, New Jersey from 1858 until the Princeton Public Schools were integrated in 1948. The school was originally located at the building still standing at 184 Witherspoon Street. As enrollment increased it moved, in 1909, to 35 Quarry Street. The Quarry Street building was expanded in 1939 and again in 1966, giving it its present appearance. The former school has since been turned into an apartment building. It was added to the National Register of Historic Places on March 9, 2005, for its significance in education.

== History and description ==
The school is built with brick and features Colonial Revival architecture. An ornate cupola is centered on the roof. In 1948 the Journal of Negro Education wrote that the Witherspoon Street School had empty spaces while the school for white children was overcrowded.

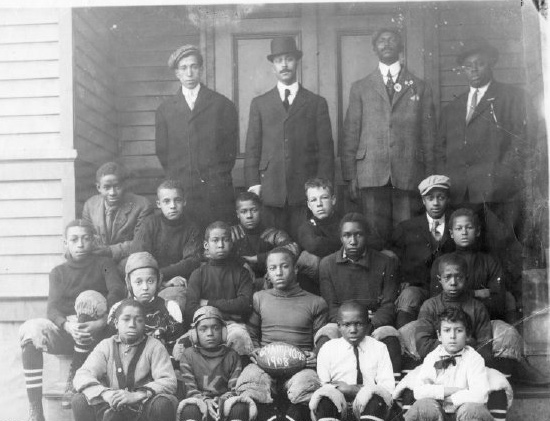
The 1908 champion YMCA team on the steps of the Witherspoon Street School

== See also ==
- Betsey Stockton
- National Register of Historic Places listings in Mercer County, New Jersey
