= Craig Sams =

UK-based businessman and author (born 1944)

Craig Sams (born 17 July 1944) is a UK-based businessman and author. He was a co-founder of Green & Black's chocolate company.

== Early life and education ==
Craig Sams was born in Nebraska, US. He graduated from Wharton Business School in 1966.

== Career ==
In October 1966, Sams went to England with plans to open a macrobiotic restaurant. His first, short-lived, macrobiotic restaurant was in the basement of Christopher Hills' Centre House off Campden Hill Road near Notting Hill as well as supplying food to the underground nightclub UFO.

He opened Seed, a macrobiotic restaurant in Paddington with his brother Greg Sams in 1968. The Sams brothers opened a specialised macrobiotic natural food shop, Ceres Grain, the following year. He and his brother Greg and their father Ken edited and published 'Seed, the Journal of Organic Living' 1971–1977. In 1970 Greg and Craig set up Harmony Foods, which eventually became known as Whole Earth Foods.

In 1991, with his partner Josephine Fairley, he founded Green & Black's chocolate, which was sold to Cadbury in 2005. He continues to be involved with the company. He writes a monthly column in the organic products section of Natural Product News

From 1990 until 2001 he was honorary treasurer of the Soil Association, the British organic food and farming charity. From 2001 to 2007 he was chairman. From 2007 to 2009 he was chairman of Soil Association Certification Ltd, the charity's inspection and certification subsidiary and continues to serve as a board member. He is co-founder and director of Carbon Gold Ltd, a biochar project and production company that converts woody biomass into charcoal that is used as a soil amendment and as a climate mitigation technology.

He is a director of Duchy Originals and of Gusto Organic

Sams is on the editorial panel of What Doctors Don't Tell You magazine.

== Publications ==
- About Macrobiotics (Thorson's 1972)
- with Ann Sams The Brown Rice Cookbook. Delicious Wholesome Macrobiotic Recipes (Thorsons 1980)
- The Macrobiotic Brown Rice Cookbook (Healing Arts Press 1994)
- The Little Food Book: You Are What You Eat (Alastair Sawday Publishing 2004)
- Sweet Dreams – The Story of Green & Black's ISBN 1905211457 (with Josephine Fairley, Random House 2008)

== See also ==
- Afghan Coat
