= The Paul Pert Screen Collection =

The Paul Pert Screen Collection is a privately owned resource consisting of several thousand original items of printed ephemera, studio publicity and merchandise produced in connection with classic and 'cult' televisual entertainment, dating predominantly from the period now affectionately referred to - on both sides of the Atlantic - as the 'Golden Age' of television.

The collection also extends into the realms of other periods, including classic television productions of the 1970s and '80s retaining sufficient merit as to warrant inclusion, and selective areas of cinema. There is also a section of the archive dedicated to optical and screen entertainment in its earliest forms, stemming from an interest in the history and development of the moving image.

The archive is grouped into 'themed' collections, in order to focus on particular shows, films, genres, studios or actors etc. - as often required to do so - in the most comprehensive manner. Access to the collection has been principally via digital reproduction since 2003, but all objects are retained in a dedicated archive store, meaning that original items may be loaned, for example for filming or exhibition. Users range from television companies, graphic designers, documentary makers, magazine editors and companies releasing classic films and television shows on DVD and Blu-ray etc., who are looking for quality images of original press and tie-in material, and accompanying literature, for sleeve design and/or special features galleries. Items from the collection have appeared on BBC Four documentaries, and DVD releases of classic TV shows released by companies such as Umbrella Entertainment and Shock Records in Australia, and Network in the UK. Releases include TV shows such as Arthur of the Britons and Smuggler (both starring Oliver Tobias ), The Adventures of Black Beauty, Catweazle, Follyfoot, and others. Also ITC Entertainment classics such as The Baron, The Champions, Danger Man, Jason King, The Saint, The Zoo Gang etc.

In common with most libraries and archives, no rights are given or implied in respect of the material, and copyright therefore rests with original creators. The collection has an international flavour and consists of items from all over the world.

Proprietor of the collection, Paul Pert, has worked in the museum world for over twenty-five years. From a show-business family, he was singer/songwriter and multi-instrumentalist with several pop/rock bands in the late 1980s and early '90s and has since written articles on various aspects of British history and culture, including music, cinema, television and theatre. His brother is singer/songwriter Steve Pert, originally a member of international vocal group 'Wall Street Crash' and now a familiar face on the British Jazz and Swing circuit with bands such as 'The Vegas Giants'.
