= William Drew Robeson I =

American clergyman (1844–1918)

The Reverend William Drew Robeson I
- Born: July 27, 1844; Martin County, North Carolina, US
- Died: May 17, 1918 (aged 73); Somerville, New Jersey, US
- Spouse: Maria Louisa Bustill
- Children: Paul Robeson, and 6 others
- Parent(s): Benjamin Robeson (1811–c1889); Sabra (1811 – c 1885)
- Relatives: Bustill family (by marriage)

William Drew Robeson I (July 27, 1844 – May 17, 1918) was an American clergyman. He was the minister of Witherspoon Street Presbyterian Church in Princeton, New Jersey from 1880 to 1901 and the father of Paul Robeson. The Witherspoon Street Presbyterian Church had been built for its black members by the First Presbyterian Church of Princeton.

== Biography ==
He was born into slavery as William Drew Robeson in 1844 to Benjamin Robeson (1820 – c. 1889) and Sabra (1825 – c. 1885). They were enslaved on the Roberson plantation near Cross Road township in Martin County, North Carolina. He was a descendant of the Igbo people.

In 1860, when he was 15 years old, Robeson escaped slavery with his brother Ezekiel through the Underground Railroad and they made their way to Philadelphia in the free state of Pennsylvania.

During the American Civil War, Robeson served in the Union Army as a laborer, entering in 1861 at the age of 16 to join the effort to end slavery in the South.

Afterward, Robeson studied at Lincoln College (now a university), where he earned an A.B. in 1873 and Bachelor of Sacred Theology in 1876.

While a student at Lincoln University he met Maria Louisa Bustill and they married in 1878. They had seven children: Gertrude (who died young), William Drew Jr., called "Bill"; John Bunyan Reeve called "Reed"; Benjamin; Marian; and Paul LeRoy Robeson (1898–1976), the youngest. Another child died at birth, but the name is not known.

In 1904 Louisa died in Princeton when Paul was six years old. Her clothes had caught fire from a coal-burning stove in a kitchen accident.

=== Princeton to Westfield ===
Robeson served as minister of the Witherspoon Street Presbyterian Church in Princeton, New Jersey from 1880 until 1901. It was built for the black members of the First Presbyterian Church of Princeton (now known as Nassau Presbyterian Church).

Robeson was ousted as minister by his church after 20 years of service. He was said to have aligned himself "on the wrong side of a church fight," having refused to bow to pressure from the "white residents of Princeton" that he cease to "speak out against social injustice." Upon his dismissal, Reverend William Drew Robeson bypassed any need "to recriminate and rebuke ... As I review the past," he said, "and think upon many scenes, my heart is filled with love." In closing his last address to his Princeton congregation, he implored them, "Do not be discouraged, do not think your past work is in vain."

He moved to Westfield, New Jersey to be the pastor of the Downer Street Saint Luke African Methodist Episcopal Zion Church from 1907 to 1910. He led the congregation through construction of their church, completed in 1908. The younger children attended the Washington School at Elm and Orchard streets. The Robesons lived on the south side of Spring Street, where it intersects with Rahway Avenue. The street is now called Watterson Street, and the house was taken down.

=== Westfield to Somerville ===
In 1910 Robeson moved to Somerville, New Jersey, where he led the congregation at the Saint Thomas African Methodist Episcopal Zion Church.

Robeson died on May 17, 1918. He was buried in Princeton Cemetery next to his wife.
