= Green & Black's =

British chocolate company

- Type: Subsidiary
- Founded: 1991; 35 years ago
- Founders: Craig Sams and Josephine Fairley
- Headquarters: London, England
- Products: Chocolate, ice cream, biscuits, baking chocolate
- Owner: Mondelēz International
- Website: web.archive.org/web/20150215232009/http://www.greenandblacks.co.uk/our-range

Green & Black's is a British chocolate company founded in 1991. The company produces a range of organic food products, including: chocolate bars, ice cream, biscuits and hot chocolate.

Green & Black's was bought by Cadbury in 2005, and later became part of Mondelēz International (formerly known as Kraft Foods). It has principal manufacturing sites in Canada, Poland, and Italy.

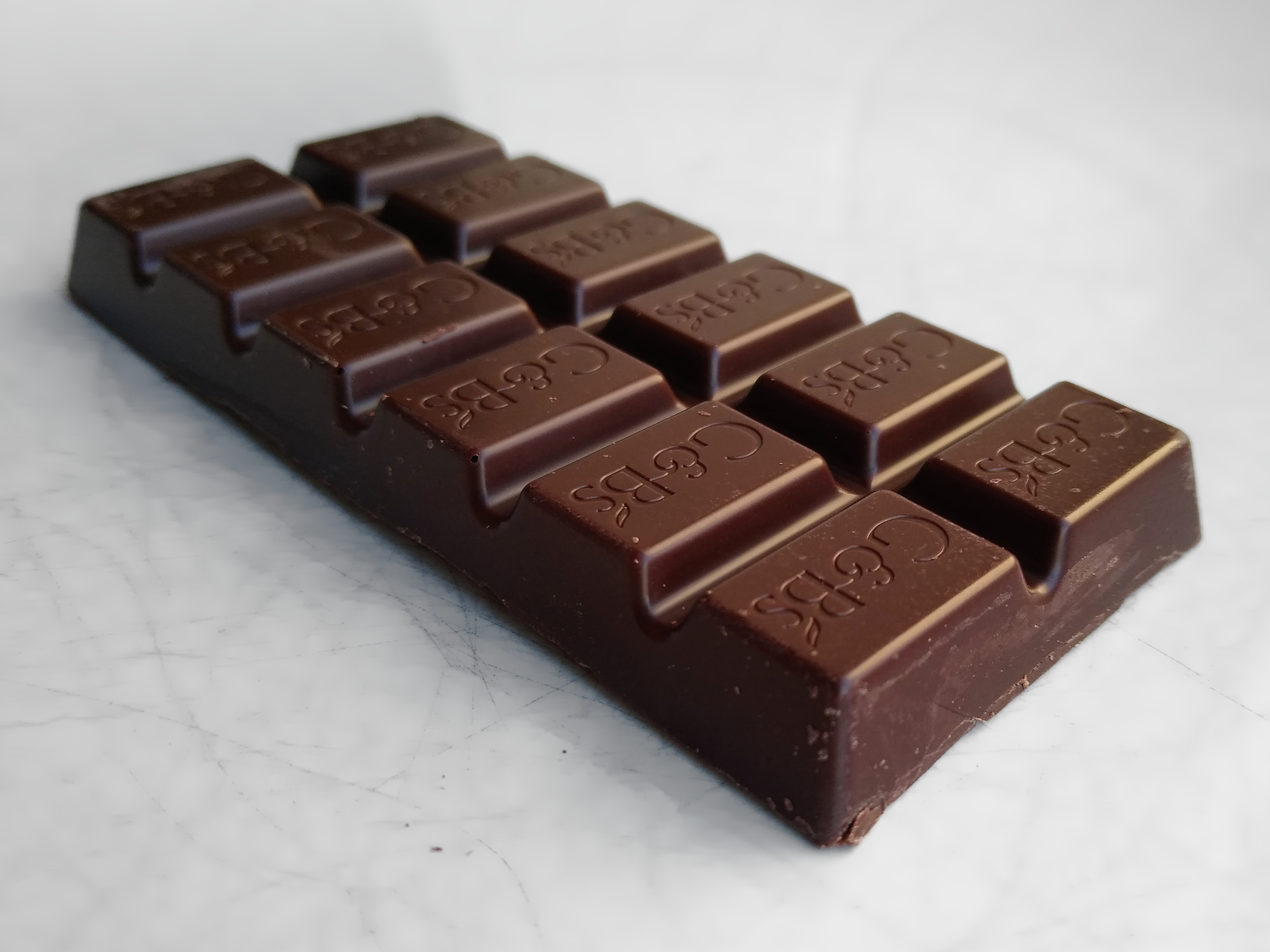
A Green and Black's dark chocolate bar

== History ==
=== Founding ===
Green & Black's was founded in 1991 by the couple Craig Sams and Josephine Fairley, organic food pioneer and journalist respectively. The name was derived from a wordplay — "Green" standing for the environmental concerns of the founders, and "Black" for the high cocoa solids chocolate they wished to provide. In 1994, the company began purchasing Fairtrade cocoa from Maya farmers in Belize for the Maya Gold chocolate bar, and was awarded the Worldaware Business Award in 1994 for good business practice, as well as the UK's first Fairtrade mark. The company has a small office in Punta Gorda, Belize.

=== Ownership changes and fairtrade ===
In May 2005, Cadbury Schweppes (latterly Cadbury plc) bought Green & Black's for an undisclosed sum, estimated to be around £20m. Cadbury pledged to run the company as a separate business.

Green & Black's Australia chocolate announced that it would convert 90% of its range to Fairtrade by the end of 2010, and its entire range by 2011. In August 2017 the company launched its first product line, the Velvet Edition, which is neither Fair Trade nor Organic.

== Metal content ==
In a 2022 review conducted by independent testing company, Consumer Reports, Green & Black's Organic Dark Chocolate 70% Cacao bar was found to exceed California's maximum allowable dose level (MADL) for lead and cadmium. An ounce of the dark chocolate bar was found to include 143% of the minimal allowable dose of lead and 181% of the minimal allowable dose for cadmium.

== Operations ==
Green & Black's has operations around the world, including the United States, United Kingdom, Canada, Australia, and other nations.

=== United States ===
Green & Black's sells chocolate bars in the United States. They are sold in stores such as Whole Foods Market and Walgreens. They have various chocolate bars, in various flavors such as "Dark 85% Cacao" and "White". All are Fairtrade Certified.

=== Recalls ===
On 15 October 2012 Mondelēz Global LLC conducted voluntary U.S. recall of Green & Black's organic peanut and sea salt milk chocolate bar due to possible health risk.

== Books ==
- Sweet Dreams – The Story of Green & Black’s Craig Sams and Josephine Fairley, ISBN 1905211457 (2008) Random House

== See also ==
- List of chocolate bar brands
