= Maria Louisa Bustill =

American Quaker schoolteacher

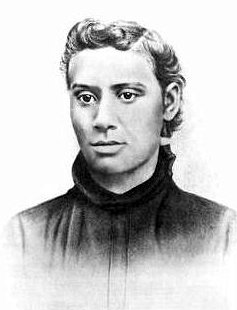
- Born: November 8, 1853; Philadelphia, Pennsylvania, U.S.
- Died: January 20, 1904 (aged 50); Princeton, New Jersey, U.S.
- Occupation: Schoolteacher
- Spouse: William Drew Robeson I (m. 1878)
- Children: 6; including Paul Robeson
- Parent: Charles Hicks Bustill (father)
- Family: Bustill

Maria Louisa Bustill Robeson (November 8, 1853 – January 20, 1904) was an American Quaker schoolteacher; the wife of the Reverend William Drew Robeson of Witherspoon Street Presbyterian Church in Princeton, New Jersey and the mother of Paul Robeson and his siblings.

== Early life and education ==
Maria Louisa Bustill (sometimes called Louisa as a child) was born in Philadelphia, Pennsylvania, of Igbo, Lenni-Lenape Native American, and Anglo-American descent. Her parents were Charles Hicks Bustill and Emily Robinson, prominent black Quakers.

In the 1870s, Louisa attended Lincoln University, a historically black university in Oxford, Pennsylvania. She was already a teacher when she met William Drew Robeson. Both she and her sister Gertrude married men who were Lincoln graduates, but her family thought Louisa had "married down" by choosing Robeson.

== Marriage and family ==
Bustill's ancestors had been free since the mid-1700s, when her great-grandfather Cyrus Bustill was freed after several years of service to a new owner in Burlington, New Jersey. He moved into Philadelphia where he built a business as a baker. Cyrus Bustill became one of the founders in Philadelphia of the Free African Society in 1787. Other family had genealogical records going back to the early days of the Pennsylvania colony.

Louisa Bustill met William Drew Robeson I (1845–1918) when he was a student at Lincoln University. She was already teaching at the Robert Vaux School for black children. Robeson had escaped slavery in North Carolina and come north with his brother Ezekiel at age 15, and worked for the Union Army during the American Civil War.

Louisa married Robeson in 1878, after he completed his undergraduate degree and one in theology. They had seven children together; two died in infancy and five lived to adulthood.

Louisa taught school and worked as a tutor while her husband was the Presbyterian minister of the Witherspoon Church in Princeton, New Jersey. The city had a relatively large black community, about 18% by the turn of the 20th century. It included both families who had long been free, like Louisa's, and others who had been born in slavery. The town had many Southern ties, and residential segregation was enforced.

Both the Robesons emphasized education and advancement for their children. Their first daughter, Gertrude Lascet Robeson (1880-1880), died as an infant. It was an upwardly mobile family; all but one of their sons were highly successful as adults, with two having professional careers: Dr. William Drew Robeson, Jr., M.D. (1881–1925) was a physician in Washington, DC; Marian M. Robeson (1894–1977) married Dr. William Forsythe, M.D. and they moved to Philadelphia, Pennsylvania; Benjamin C. Robeson (1893–1963), was a minister at the African Methodist Episcopal Zion Church in Harlem, New York City; John Bunyan Reeve Robeson (1886–1973) aka Reed Robeson, moved to Detroit, where he worked as a laborer and may have worked at a hotel, then again moved to Sioux City, Iowa where he died in poverty. The youngest surviving child, Paul LeRoy Robeson, better known as Paul Robeson (1898–1976), became an internationally known athlete, orator, singer and actor. He also became an activist for civil rights. Another child died at birth, but the name is not known.

== Death and burial ==
By 1904 Louisa was nearly blind from cataracts. She was severely burned in a kitchen accident when an ember from the stove ignited her clothes. She died several days later with burns over 80% of her body. She was buried in Princeton Cemetery.
