= Sengstacke =

Sengstacke is a surname. Notable people with the surname include:

- John H. Sengstacke (1912–1997), American newspaper publisher
- Robert A. Sengstacke (1943–2017), American photojournalist

== See also ==
- Robert Sengstacke Abbott (1870–1940), American lawyer, newspaper publisher, and editor
