= History of the Belgian Americans in Metro Detroit =

Detroit and its metro area, has a Belgian American population. At the beginning of the twenty-first century, Michigan was home to the second-largest Belgian population in the United States, and Detroit had one of the largest Belgian populations in the nation.

== History ==
In 1834 Father Bonduel of Commines, Belgium was the first priest to be ordained in Detroit. The first Catholic college (1836) was operated by Flemish Belgian priests, and the first school for girls was founded (in 1834) by an order of Belgian nuns. By 1857 Catholics in Detroit were a sizable group, and in 1884 the first Belgian parish was established. However, many Belgian Catholic parishes have disappeared or merged with other parishes due to the shortage of priests.

The Gazette van Detroit ("Gazette of Detroit"), a Flemish newspaper in Dutch and English, was published between 1914 and 2018.

== Notable individuals ==
Detroit Mayor Eugene Van Antwerp was of Belgian descent on both sides of his family.

== Groups dedicated to Belgian history and culture ==
- The Belgian American Association: https://thebaa.us/
- Gazette van Detroit - Flemish-language newspaper first printed in Detroit (now defunct)
