= Belgian Americans =

Americans of Belgian birth or descent

Belgian Americans. French Belgo-Américains Dutch Belgische Amerikanen
Total population
- 312,593 (2024)

Regions with significant populations
- Wisconsin · Michigan · Ohio · New York · Florida · Illinois · California · Minnesota · Indiana

Languages
- English · Dutch (Flemish dialects) · French · Walloon (Wisconsin Walloon) · German

Religion
- Predominantly Roman Catholicism

Related ethnic groups
- French Americans · Dutch Americans · German Americans · Luxembourgish Americans

Belgian Americans are people in the United States who can trace their ancestry to immigrants from Belgium. While the first natives of the then-Southern Netherlands arrived in America in the 17th century, most Belgian immigrants arrived during the 19th and the 20th centuries.

According to the 2019 U.S. census, there are 339,512 Americans who identify themselves as partially or fully of Belgian ancestry. Others may identify as "Flemish Americans".

As of 2024, the number of Americans of self-reported Belgian ancestry is 312,593.

== History ==
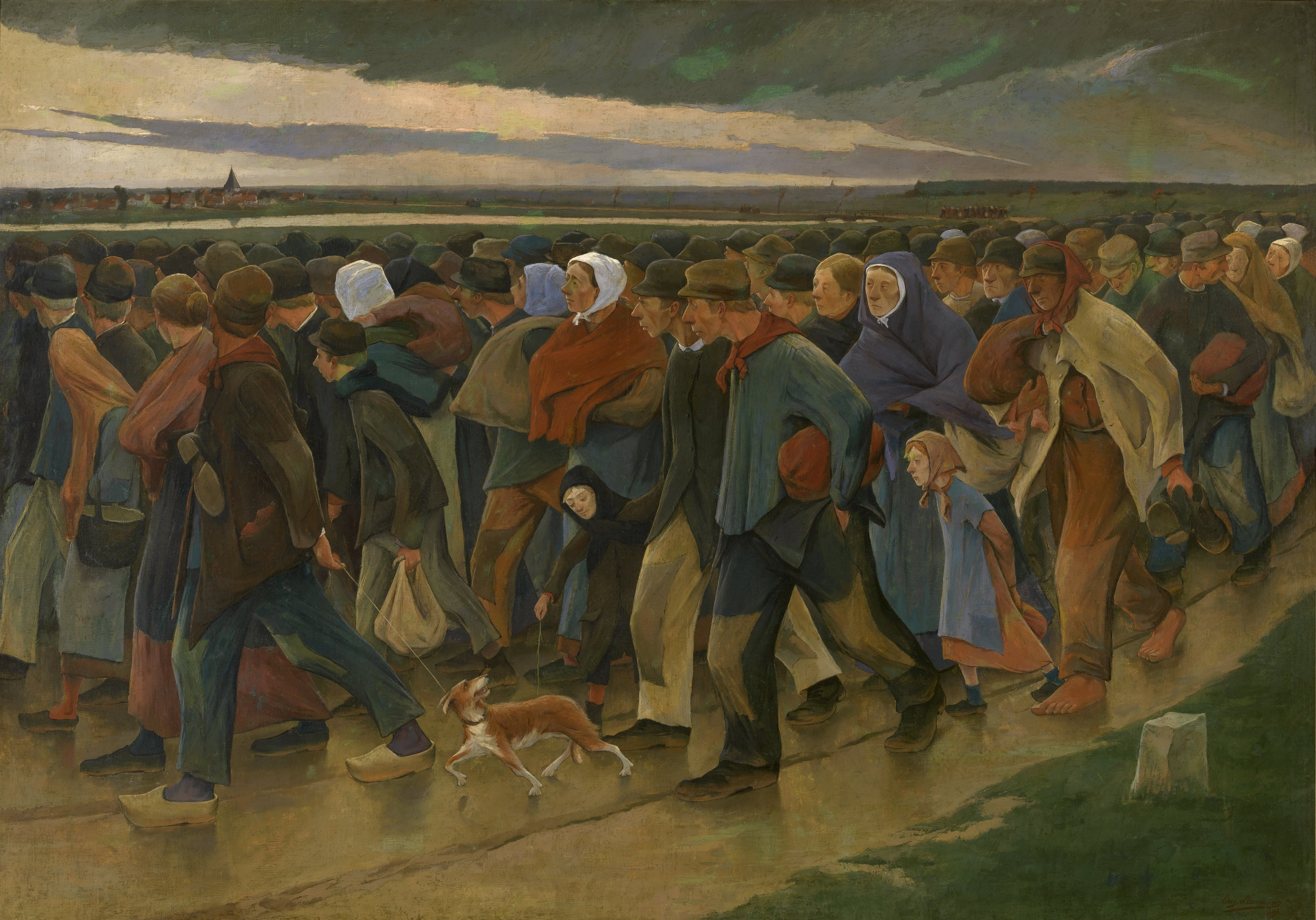
The Emigrants (1896) by the Belgian artist Eugène Laermans

During the 17th century, colonists from the Southern Netherlands (now Belgium) lived in several of the Thirteen Colonies of North America. Settlements already existed in New York in Wallabout (Brooklyn), on Long Island and Staten Island and in New Jersey (Hoboken, Jersey City, Pavonia, Communipaw, and Wallkill). Later, other settlers moved into the Mid-Atlantic States. Many names are derived from the Walloon Reformed immigrants who settled there and the Dutch versions of Walloon words that were used to describe locales. There were also Southern Netherlands colonies in Connecticut, Delaware, and Pennsylvania established primarily by Walloons, many of whom arrived with the Dutch West India Company (founded by Willem Usselincx, a Fleming).

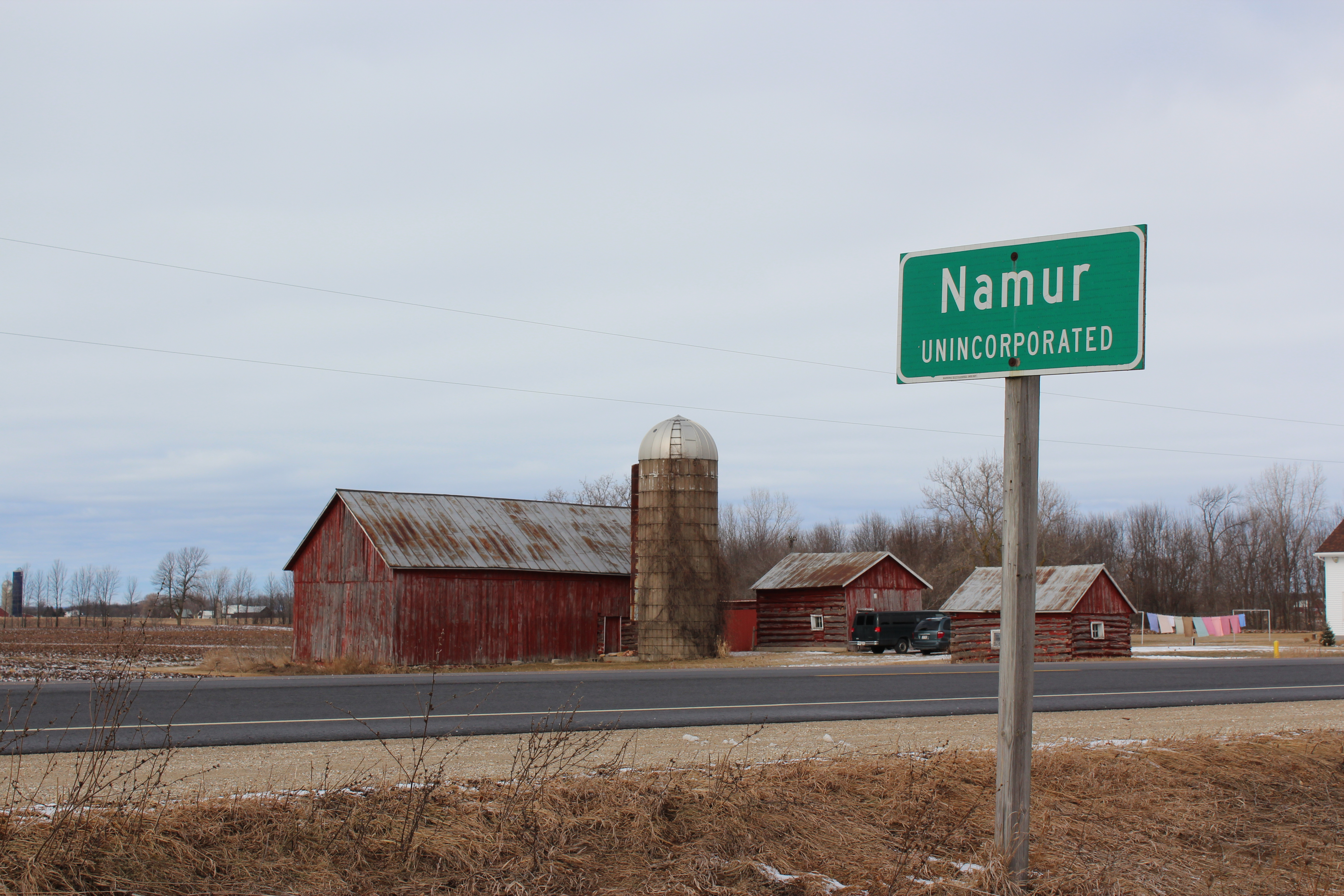
Namur, Wisconsin, a Belgian American settlement named after the Belgian city of Namur

During this era, most Belgians coming to the United States were farmers, farm workers, or miners; craftsmen (such as masons, cabinetmakers or carpenters); or other persons engaged in commerce (such as lace-makers or glass blowers). During the 20th century, many Belgians arrived in the United States to work in spaces such as universities, laboratories and industry. This is especially true after the world wars ended. Several Dutch-language newspapers were published by Belgian immigrants, including the Gazette van Moline (1907–1940) and the Gazette van Detroit (1914–2018). From 1820 to 1970, about 200,000 Belgians immigrated to the United States. Since 1950, about 1,350 Belgians migrate to the United States each year.

== Demographics ==
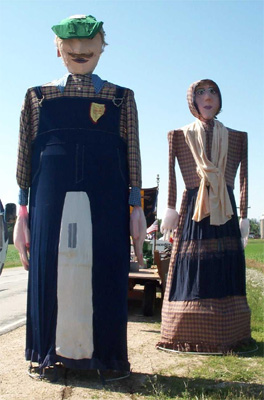
Two processional giants, an important element of Belgian and Northern French folklore, pictured in Brussels, Wisconsin.

=== Population ===
According to the 2000 U.S. census, there were 360,642 Americans whose ancestors came from Belgium. The states with the largest Belgian communities are:

- Wisconsin: 57,808 (out of 5,363,675 = 1.08%)
- Michigan: 53,135 (out of 9,938,444 = 0.53%)
- Illinois: 34,208 (out of 12,419,293 = 0.28%)
- California: 26,820
- Minnesota: 15,627 (out of 4,919,479 = 0.32%)
- Florida: 14,751
- New York: 12,034
- Indiana: 11,918
- Texas: 10,595
- Ohio: 9,651

Also, some middle-sized communities are in Washington, Tennessee, Kentucky, Missouri and Iowa.

== Culture ==
Popular foods among Belgian Americans are roast chicken, veal, sausages, and beef served as stew, meatloaf or meatballs, shellfish and fish such as smoked herring or fried perch with a sauce made of the fond and vegetables such as potatoes, root crops, leeks, and cabbage, breads, pies, Belgian waffles, and beer. Fruits such as apples and cherries, locally grown in the Upper Midwest are included in pies and other cooked Belgian sweets. Urban Belgian American cuisine are mussels, frites and chocolate imported from Belgium.

== Religions ==
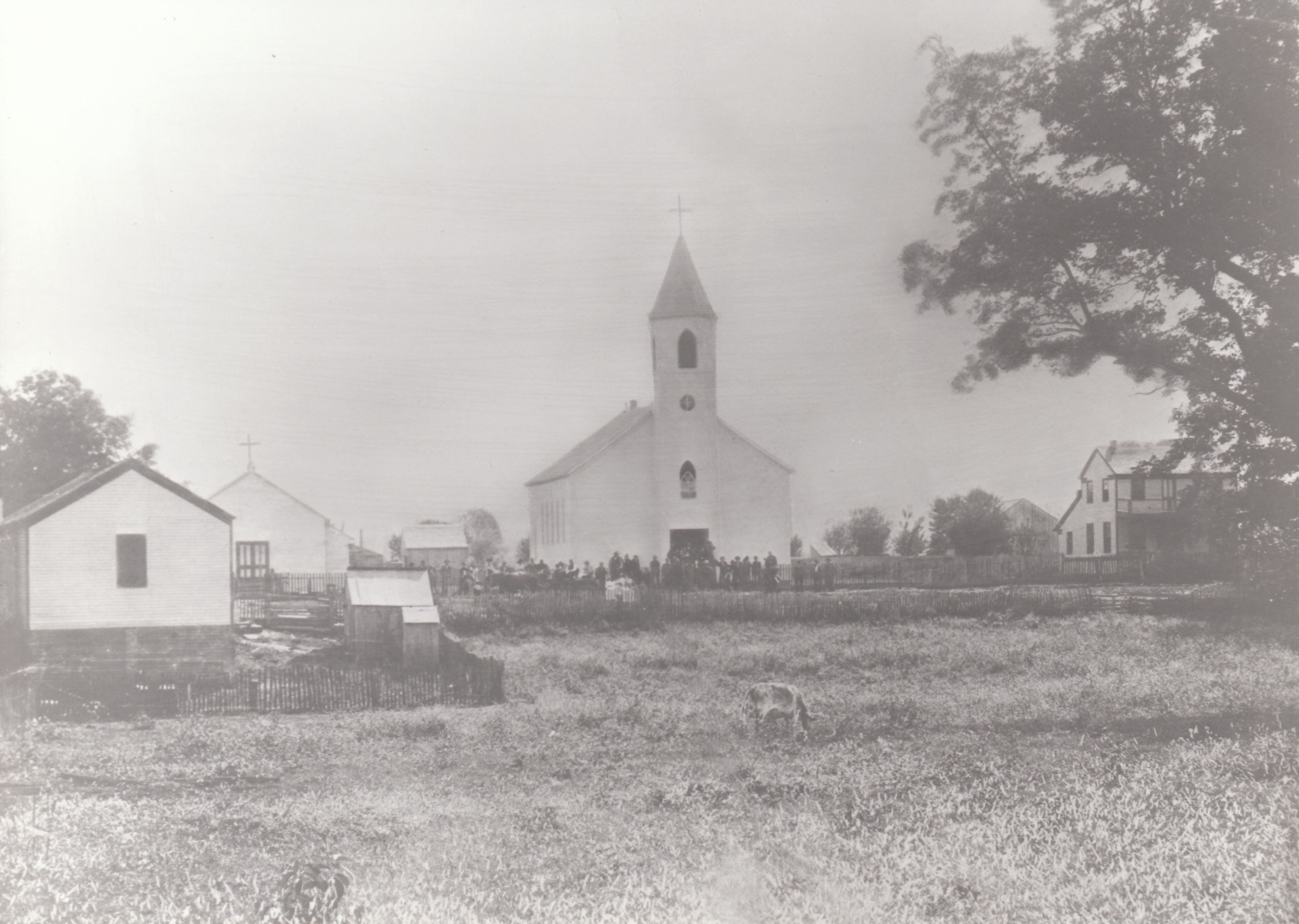
19th-century view of Belgique, Missouri, and its church

The majority of Belgian Americans are Roman Catholic although some are Presbyterians and Episcopalians. By 1900, Belgian religious orders were present in 16 states. The Sisters of Notre Dame de Namur established bilingual schools in 14 of those states, and the Benedictines built missions in the West. The Jesuits founded St. Louis University in 1818, expanding the university's influence with Belgian teachers and benefactors. Belgian immigrants do not usually have churches of their own and attend Catholic churches that were founded by other ethnic Catholics. However, two more-homogeneous groups (in Door County, Wisconsin, and Detroit, Michigan) established churches of their own.

Since then, Belgians have established several churches in the United States. In 1853, a Belgian missionary, Father Edward Daems, joined with a group of immigrants to establish a community in Bay Settlement, Wisconsin known as Aux premiers Belges (Naar de eerste Belgen) ("to the first Belgians"). By 1860, St. Hubert's Church had been built in Bay Settlement and St. Mary's in Namur. Also built in the 19th century were St. Michael's, St. John the Baptist, and St. Joseph's in Door County; the French Presbyterian Church in Green Bay; and small roadside chapels for people who lived too far away to attend parish churches regularly.

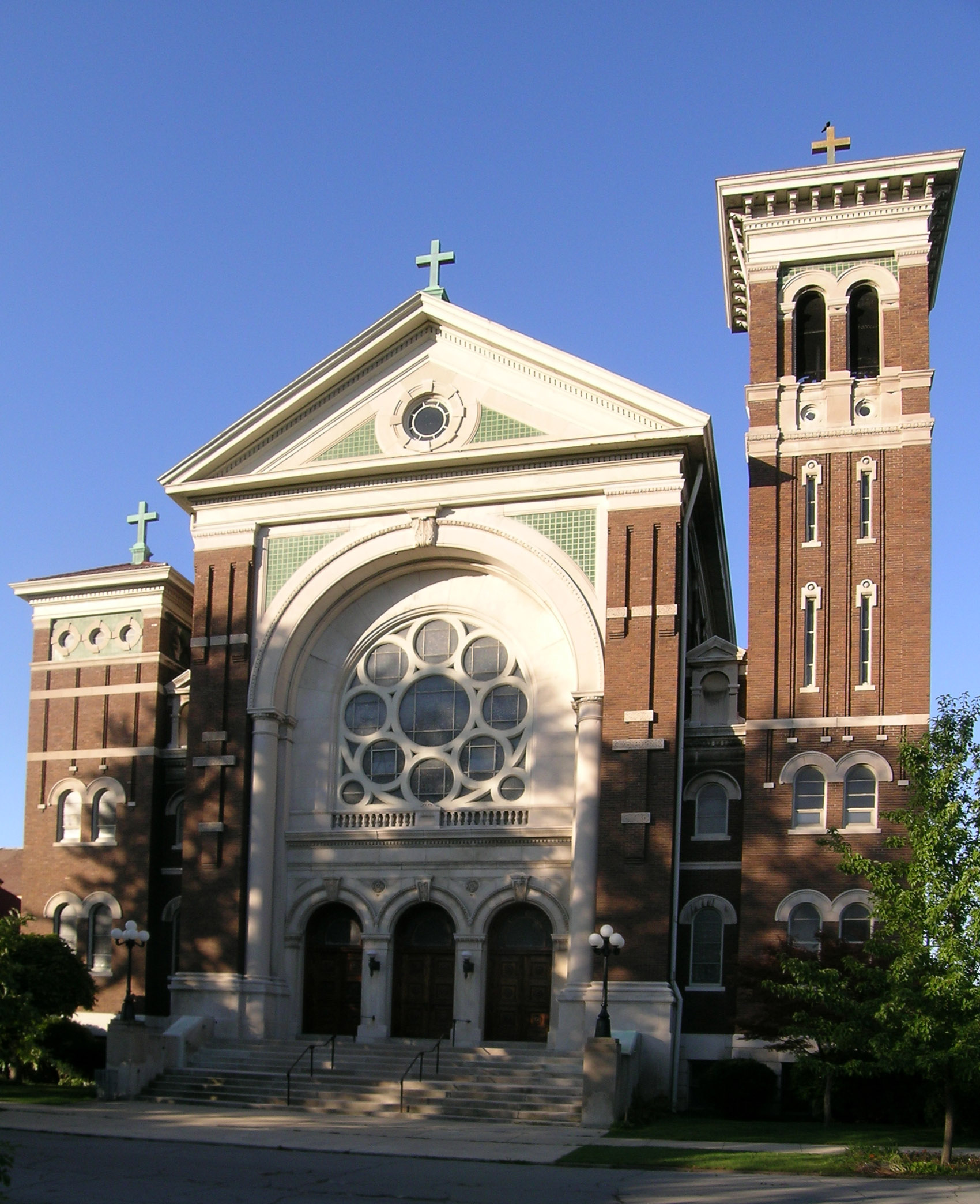
St. Charles Borromeo church in Detroit, Michigan was built by Flemish immigrants in 1912

In 1834, Father Florimond Bonduel, from Commines, was the first priest to be ordained in Detroit. The first Catholic college (1836) was operated by Flemish Belgian priests, and the first school for girls was founded in 1834 by an order of Belgian nuns. By 1857, Catholics in Detroit were a sizable group, and in 1884, the first Belgian parish was established. However, many Belgian Catholic parishes have disappeared or merged with other parishes because of the shortage of priests.

== Military service ==
Belgian Americans fought in the American Revolutionary War, both world wars and the Korean and Vietnam Wars. During World War I, Belgian Americans gave generously to the aid of children who were victims of the war, which resulted in an official delegation from Belgium to the United States honoring their efforts in 1917.

== See also ==
- Adele Brice
- Jessé de Forest
- Belgian Canadians
- Belgium–United States relations
- European Americans
- Dutch Americans
- French Americans
- German Americans
- Luxembourgish Americans
