= Robert A. Sengstacke =

African-American photojournalist

- Sengstacke circa 1970.
- Born: May 29, 1943; Chicago, Illinois, U.S.
- Died: March 7, 2017 (aged 73); Hammond, Indiana, U.S.
- Resting place: Chicago, Illinois
- Education: Hyde Park High School; University of Chicago Lab Schools; Bethune-Cookman College (attended)
- Occupation: Photojournalist
- Years active: 1960s–2015
- Employers: Chicago Daily Defender; Muhammad Speaks; Fisk University; Memphis Tri-State Defender; Eastman Kodak Company; Sengstacke Enterprises Inc.
- Known for: Notable photography of the civil rights era.
- Movement: Civil Rights Movement (United States)
- Spouses: Veela Gonzales (divorced); Jacquelyn Spencer Sengstacke (m. 1991)
- Children: 6
- Parents: John H. Sengstacke (father); Myrtle Picou (mother)
- Family: Robert Sengstacke Abbott (great–uncle)
- Awards: NNPA Awards; Superior Public Service Award; John B. Russwurm Award; Robert S. Abbott Memorial Award; Gordon Park Award; Cannon 40D Award

Robert Abbott Sengstacke (May 29, 1943 – March 7, 2017), also known as Bobby Sengstacke, was an African-American photojournalist during the Civil Rights Movement for the Chicago Defender in Chicago, Illinois. Sengstacke was well known for his famous portraits of Martin Luther King Jr. and other prominent civil rights leaders. Sengstacke inherited the family–owned Sengstacke Newspaper Company. After retiring from journalism in 2015, Sengstacke moved to Hammond, Indiana where he lived until his death due to a respiratory illness in 2017 at age 73.

== Biography ==
=== Early life and education ===
Born in 1943, Robert A. Sengstacke was the product of the Sengstacke family newspaper business legacy in Chicago. He was the son of John H. Sengstacke and Myrtle Sengstacke. Sengstacke resided for most of his life in Chicago. For elementary education, Sengstacke attended the University of Chicago Lab School, Manumit School in Bristol, Pennsylvania and Howalton Day School in Chicago. Sengstacke attended Hyde Park High School (now Hyde Park Academy High School) and later graduated from Central YMCA High School in 1962. Sengstacke took over his family business later on in his life.

=== Career ===
Sengstacke started work at the age of 16 at his family's newspaper business, working small jobs. Sengstacke then went to school in Los Angeles, California, and began photographing Black sororities and fraternities. He returned to Chicago to take part in documenting the Black Arts Movement and the Civil Rights Movement. Sengstacke went on to work for the Muhammad Speaks publications, Chicago's Mayor Richard J. Daley, and as the cast photographer for Oscar Brown Jr. Productions. He became the editor and publisher of Memphis Tri-State Defender from 1974 until 1989. Shortly after, Sengstacke became President of the Sengstacke Newspaper and the Chicago Defender.

=== Chicago Defender ===
The Chicago Defender was a newspaper for African Americans founded in 1905. The newspaper was founded by Robert Sengstacke Abbott. Abbott's nephew, John, was Sengstacke's father, and was the previous owner before his passing in the late nineties. Robert A. Sengstacke inherited the newspaper upon his father's death. Sengstacke took the newspaper from a weekly to daily newspaper in the United States. The paper was a voice for African Americans all around. He went on to control the newspaper for six decades. He also purchased newspapers like, the Michigan Chronicle, the Tri-State Defender, and the New Pittsburgh Couriers. He was active in promoting Black Culture and advocating for civil rights in his paper. He is remembered for his generosity to young photographers and his commitment to the African American Community. Throughout the years that he ran the newspaper he took on a number of roles. He acted as the Defender's promotions and Marketing Director, Special Events and Fundraiser for the Bud Billiken Parade and becoming the editor and publisher of the Memphis Tri-State Defender. His photography that was featured in the Defender, like portraits of Dr. Martin Luther King Jr., is critically acclaimed nationally and internationally. The Chicago Defender was eventually sold to a company called Real Time but the Chicago Defender maintained a charity now ran by Sengstacke's daughter Myiti Sengstacke.

== Notable Works and exhibits ==
Sengstacke was a photojournalist. He is best known for his portraits of Dr. Martin Luther King Jr., Malcolm X, and Muhammad Ali. He painted the Sengstacke Eye Mural in a neighborhood in Chicago called Bronzeville. He also collaborated with other Black artists on the Wall of Respect, contributing to the religion section of the mural and documenting its creation through his photographs. He took a large body of photos of African Americans protesting during the Black Arts Movement and the civil rights movement. He worked on famous projects like Summer in The City and Opportunity Please Knock. His portfolios have appeared in many publications, including Ebony, Jet, Essence, Life, and the Washington Post. His work also was seen on the TV and in theaters. Filmmaker Spike Lee featured some of his photography in his film School Daze, and Patti LaBelle featured his famous poster of Dr. Martin Luther King Jr. on her TV sitcom Out All Night. His work also appeared in books like: The Dream Lives On:Martin Luther King Jr, African American Art, and The Photography of Martin Luther King Jr. Sengstacke works has been exhibited in many places. His work was featured in a major exhibit in 1969 at the Chicago Loop Public Library branch. Some of his work that was showcased there were pieces like, The Wall of Respect: Vestigies, Snards and The Legacy of Black Power. The Wall of Respect was the highlight of this exhibit because it revealed portraits of famous African American Public Figures. His works has also been exhibited at the Statue of Liberty, Smithsonian Institution, and the Museum of Science and Industry in Chicago.

Sengstacke's work was included in the 2025 exhibition Photography and the Black Arts Movement, 1955–1985 at the National Gallery of Art.

== Personal life and death ==
Sengstacke fathered six children and was married twice. His first marriage was to Veela Gonzalez, with whom he had four children, Saief, Myiti, Omhari, and Hasani. Sengstacke later married Jacquelyn Spencer and together they had two children, Domenic and Jasmine. Sengstacke and Spencer were married at the time of his death. Sengstacke died on March 7, 2017, in Hammond, Indiana. Sengstacke was suffering from an extended respiratory illness. His memorial service took place at the Logan Center of Arts on the University of Chicago Campus in his hometown of Chicago.

== Awards ==
Robert A. Sengstacke has won many awards. He received the NNPA Award in 1986-1987 for his Michigan Chronicle newspaper. He went on to win the NNPA Award for his New Pittsburgh Courier paper in 1995. He also received the Superior Public Award in 1977. He was also awarded the Cannon 40D award and the Gordon Parks Award for leadership in film making, multimedia making and photojournalism. The Sengstakce paper won the John B. Russman Award. His father John H.H Sengstacke was awarded the Presidential Citizens Medal for forming the African American Newspaper organization. There also was a Robert S. Abbott Memorial Award made in Sengstacke's granduncle's honor.

== See also ==
- List of photographers of the civil rights movement
