= History of African Americans in Detroit =

Black Detroiters

Total population
- 960,838 (2017)

Regions with significant populations
- Throughout Detroit

Languages
- Inland Northern American English, African-American Vernacular English, African languages

Religion
- Black Protestant

Black Detroiters are black or African American residents of Detroit. According to the U.S. Census Bureau, Black or African Americans living in Detroit accounted for 79.1% of the total population, or approximately 532,425 people as of 2017 estimates. According to the 2000 U.S. census, of all U.S. cities with 100,000 or more people, Detroit had the second-highest percentage of Black people.

Many black Detroiters have moved to the suburbs or Southern cities such as Atlanta, Dallas, Houston, Birmingham, Memphis, San Antonio and Jackson. Nearby suburbs also had higher Black populations, reflecting the history of settlement of African Americans here during the Great Migration of the early 20th century, when people were attracted to Detroit's industrial jobs: Southfield had a Black population of 42,259, and Pontiac 31,416. In 2002 the Michigan city with the highest percentage of Black residents was Highland Park, where 93% of the population is Black. In the 2010 census, African Americans made up 22.8% of the total city and metropolitan area population in Wayne, Oakland, and Macomb counties.

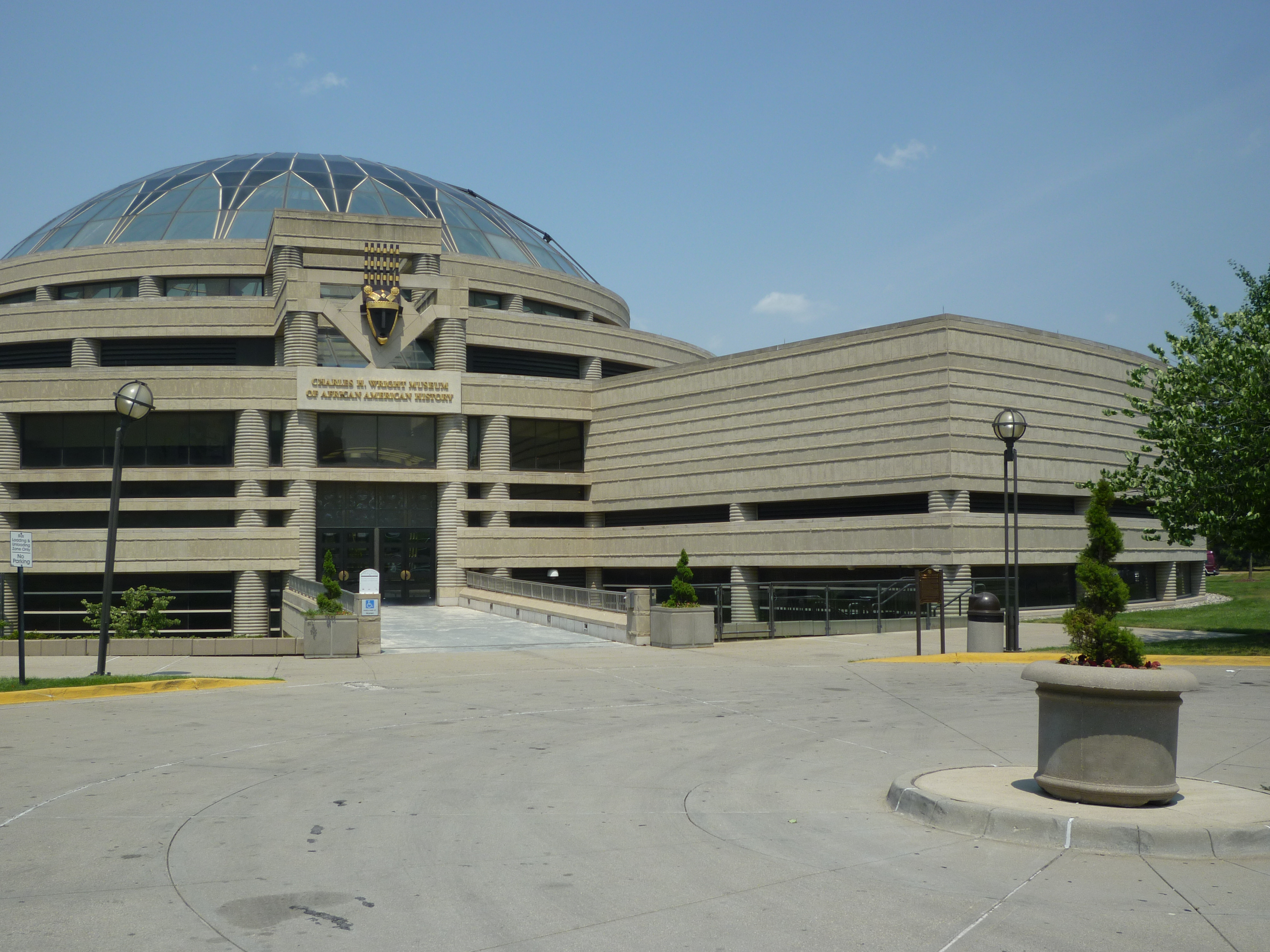
Charles H. Wright Museum of African-American History, founded in 1965 in Detroit

== History of African-American settlement ==
=== Pre-1865 ===
Among African Americans who moved to Detroit from the American South before the end of slavery were George and Richard DeBaptiste. They attended classes taught by Rev. Samuel H. Davis, the pastor at the Second Baptist Church in the city. Marcus Dale attended the African Methodist Episcopal church led by Rev. John M. Brown and others. In the days before the Civil War began, Detroit was an important site on the Underground Railroad, in which local people aided the passage of fugitive slaves to freedom. Its location just across the river from Canada, where slavery was abolished in 1834, made it a destination for many seeking freedom. Although Michigan was a free territory, some refugee slaves wanted to go over the border to Canada to prevent being captured by slavecatchers. Others settled in Detroit.

Local blacks involved in the Underground Railroad work included Samuel C. Watson (who later opened a drug store in Detroit), William Whipper, Richard and George DeBaptiste, and others. William Lambert, Laura Haviland, and Henry Bibb were also involved. Many Detroit African Americans served in the American Civil War (1861–1865). The 102nd Regiment United States Colored Troops of Michigan and Illinois was recruited in large part in Detroit.

Blacks in Detroit had to face rising tensions from ethnic whites before and after the Emancipation Proclamation was issued in January 1863. A Democratic Party paper, The Detroit Free Press, supported white supremacy and opposed President Abraham Lincoln's handling of the war. In addition, it consistently presented issues of the day as problems due to competition with free blacks, projecting threats to white men's power and forecasting worse labor problems if the mass of slaves were freed. In March 1863, a race riot broke out in Detroit. Catalyzed by the arrest of a mixed-race man for allegedly molesting a white girl, a white mob attacked blacks and their neighborhood, resulting in two deaths (one, white and one black), numerous people injured, 35 houses and businesses destroyed, and more than 200 people left homeless. As a result, the city established its first full-time police force.

=== 1865-1890 ===
After the war, African Americans formed an important political block in the city, led by Watson, George DeBaptiste, John D. Richards, and Walter Y. Clark. Saginaw's William Q. Atwood was an important figure outside Detroit who influenced the city's African-American politics as well.

=== 1890-1929 ===
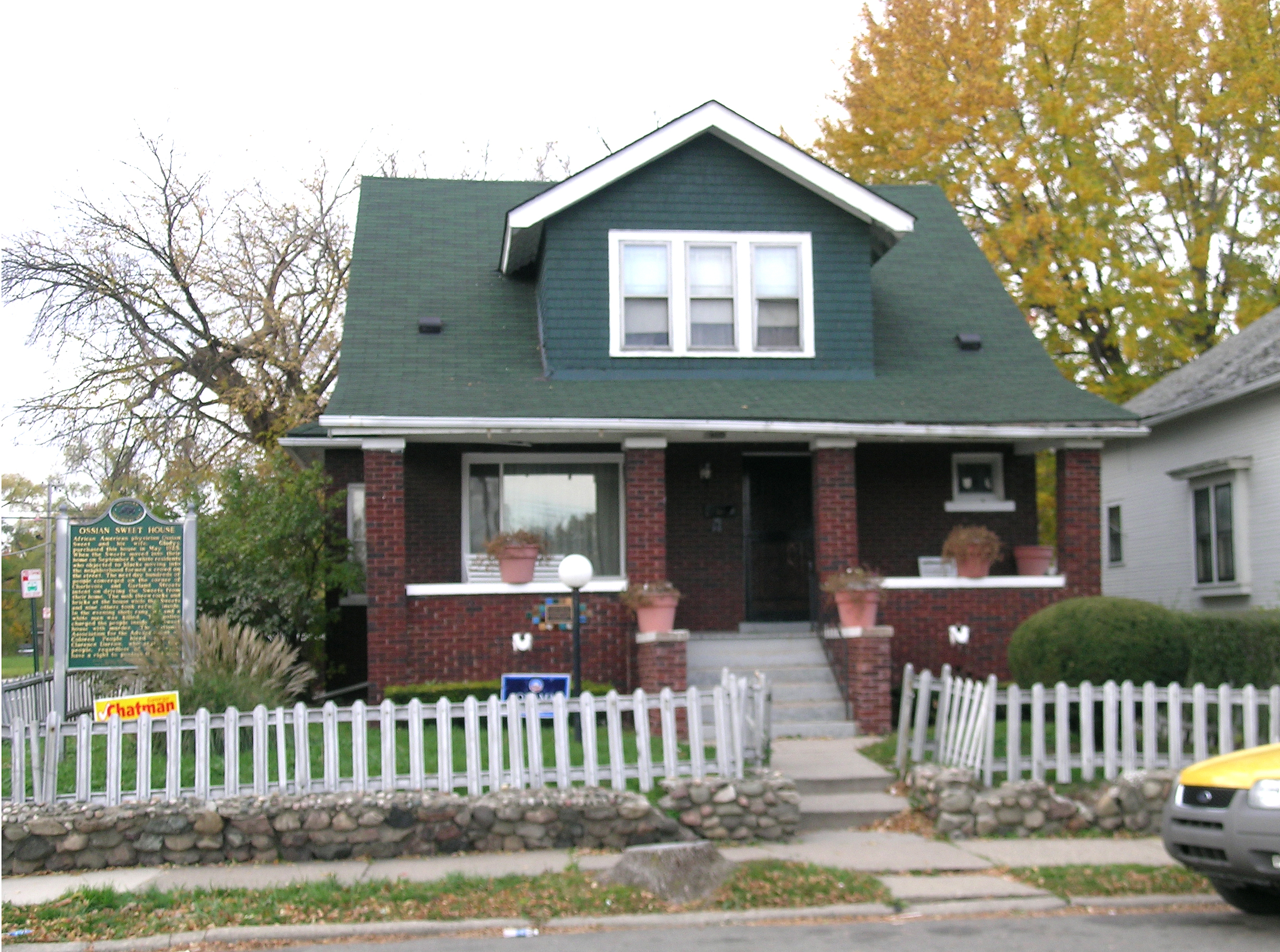
Ossian Sweet House

Before World War I, Detroit had about 4,000 Black people, 1% of its population. In the 1890s, journalist and founder of the black paper, Detroit Plaindealer, Robert Pelham Jr. and lawyer D. Augustus Straker worked in Detroit and throughout the state to create branches of the National Afro-American League. The pair were active, in part through the league, in supporting Blacks in legal trouble. Pelham was also an important figure in the league at a national level.

The first major period of Black growth occurred from 1910 to 1930, during the economic expansion in the auto industry. At the time in Detroit, most Blacks lived in mixed communities containing other racial groups, often recent European immigrants, as both groups were making their way and had to take older housing.

Due to the war effort in World War I, many men enlisted in the armed forces, and employers needed workers. They recruited African Americans from the South, who were also on the move as part of the first Great Migration. They sought more opportunity and a chance to leave behind the oppression of the Jim Crow South. From 1910 to 1930, the Black population of Detroit increased from under 6,000 to over 120,000, as the city developed as the fourth largest in the country. By 1920, of Michigan's Black residents, 87% were born outside of the state, and most of those came from the South. Because landlords began to restrict access to housing, Black residents were forced into small districts, which became overcrowded as the population grew. T. J. Sugrue, author of The Origins of the Urban Crisis: Race and Inequality in Postwar Detroit, wrote that the first geographic racial divisions between Whites and Blacks developed during the Great Migration.

In 1912 the National Association for the Advancement of Colored People (NAACP) founded a Detroit chapter. The Detroit Urban League was founded in 1916. Both organizations used the support of Black churches. Steve Babson, author of Working Detroit: The Making of a Union Town, wrote that in the early 20th century the Black population "was relatively behind the middle-class leadership" of the NAACP and the Urban League.

Around the 1920s and 1930s Black people working in Henry Ford's factories settled in Inkster because they did not want to commute from Detroit and they were not allowed to live in Dearborn. Whites resisted even middle-class blacks moving into their neighborhoods. In 1925 the State of Michigan charged physician Ossian Sweet with murder after he used a shotgun to kill a white man who was part of a mob trying to force him to leave his newly purchased house, located in a mostly white neighborhood. Sweet was acquitted of his charges.

=== 1930-present ===
During the Great Depression, the population stagnated. The Black population growth was at the lowest rate since 1910. As the US entry into World War II disrupted the labor market by drafting numbers of young men, the demand for labor grew with the expansion of the war industries. Sections of the auto industry were converted to wartime production of the arsenal and vehicles needed for war, and a new wave of Black people migrated from the South. President Franklin D. Roosevelt issued an Executive Order to prevent discrimination among defense contractors, increasing opportunities for minorities in the range of jobs and supervisory positions. This was resisted by some working-class Whites. In the period from 1940 to 1950, more than 66% of the Black population in Detroit had been born outside the area, with most born in the South. The increase in population had strained city schools and services for all residents.

==== Housing Crisis ====
Competition in employment and housing spheres increased social tensions in the city. Insufficient housing opportunities for African Americans led to a polarized political and economic landscape. The government attempted to ease the housing pressure by building projects for working-class families, but whites resented placement of these projects in their neighborhoods. As a result, black housing was allocated in deeply impoverished areas that regressed into further dangerous and disease filled locations. Since Black individuals were forced to take low-earning jobs, the density of Black families in this area known as "Black Bottom" increased, and further exacerbated its destitute living conditions. Federal housing policies effectively stymied the progress of African Americans in the city of Detroit, and, consequently, housing shortages disproportionately targeted African American citizens. African Americans in Detroit were systematically shut out of the housing market due to structural racism. This hindered their ability to accumulate generational wealth, putting generations of African Americans at a disproportionate economic disadvantage.

===== Redlining =====
Residential segregation was prevalent as structures of disinvestment amplified hypersegregation along both racial and economic lines. In 1935, the Federal Home Loan Bank Act (FHLB) commissioned 239 lending maps for the Federal Housing Administration (FHA) and the Home Owners Loan Corporation (HOLC) to document and evaluate what neighborhoods throughout the country were lending risks. Many areas of Detroit were redlined as a result of being designated "high risk" neighborhoods. Neighborhoods that were graded as hazardous for lending were primarily composed of minority groups, and these redlined neighborhoods illustrated the ways in which economic inequality disproportionately targeted African Americans. Citizens residing in these neighborhoods were denied loans by lending institutions, and consequently they were unable to purchase or fix homes. Since black individuals were not able to leave their impoverished neighborhoods and were not able to improve their homes through loans, the concentration of poverty within black bottom increased. Such policies worsen the condition of black housing solely on the basis of race. The lack of mobility for black people reaffirmed stereotypes white communities held about the moral integrity of black neighborhoods because of the destitute conditions black communities were stuck in.

===== Racially Restrictive Covenants =====
Federal and state policies further exacerbated segregation through the use of racially restrictive covenants within the city. Racially restrictive covenants were legally bound contracts that outlawed the residency of African Americans within a given area. These covenants ensured the maintenance of racial homogeneity in white neighborhoods and their use was incentivized by early federal housing policy that awarded higher ratings to racially homogeneous neighborhoods. By 1940, 80% of Detroit's residencies abided by racial covenants, and thereby restricted black housing to historically impoverished and dangerous areas on the basis of race. The Michigan Supreme Court upheld the enforceability of racial covenants.

===== Public Housing =====
Despite these discriminatory policies, the federal government did attempt to help improve housing access to those they disproportionately disadvantaged. The Wagner-Steagall Act was passed in 1937 to subsidize local public housing agencies. However, public housing efforts throughout the 1940s were met with opposition from several parties. Suburban governments and community groups concerned with racial homogeneity resisted public housing projects. Real estate developers also opposed public housing projects as they believed that these projects threatened their private enterprises. Even elected officials opposed public housing to prevent backlash from their white, middle-class supporters. For instance, Mayor Albert Cobo outwardly supported white homeowner groups and pledged upon being elected in 1949 that "it will not be the purpose of the administration to scatter public housing projects throughout the city, just because funds may be forthcoming from the Federal Government". This strong opposition from local forces in Detroit undermined public housing efforts and solidified spatial barriers of race.

There were, however, pro-public housing groups, the most important being the Citizens' Housing and Planning Council (CHPC). The goal of this organization was to improve environmental conditions in slums by replacing suboptimal living and sanitary conditions with more adequate housing for African Americans. This reform aimed to ameliorate poor living spaces and construct a cleaner environment that was more conducive to public health and morale. This organization inevitably faced strong opposition from anti-public housing groups and white homeowners who were fixated on maintaining racial homogeneity in their neighborhoods.

===== Slum Removal =====
The use of redlining and racially restrictive covenants trapped black Detroiters in inadequate, disinvested neighborhoods. The failure of the federal government to erect substantial public housing solidified this housing segregation. The Detroit City Planning Commission (CPC) then intentionally destroyed these already disadvantaged black communities and neighborhoods they referred to as "slums" in an effort to improve the city's conditions, highways, hospitals, and apartment buildings. Having Detroit's city leadership in the 1940s and 1950s attribute redevelopment and renovation with destroying "dangerous" parts of the city made black bottom especially vulnerable to displacement. The CPC subsequently failed to provide adequate resources for relocation to the black families whose homes and neighborhoods were destroyed. This resulted in the movement of displaced African Americans into already inadequate and overcrowded housing in disproportionately black neighborhoods. This displacement and disappearance of black communities resulted in the disappearance of black culture and tradition. Systematic discrimination in housing contributed to volatile race relations in the city of Detroit.

===== Opposition from Homeowner Associations =====
After the decision of Shelly v. Kramer banned racial covenants, efforts to keep neighborhoods segregated were propelled by Homeowners associations. Members from white concentrated neighborhoods organized and used grassroots activism to prevent integration from sullying the “high character” that their white dominated neighborhoods provided. These associations flexed their agencies in a number of ways. Through the use of mutual reciprocal legal agreements, homeowners associations maintained racially specific language to bar black people from obtaining loans in white populated areas. Further, homeowners associations leveraged the ownership of the homes in their neighborhood to safeguard sales to black individuals. Associations such as the Plymouth Manor association required its members to only contract with approved real estate brokers that would guarantee that loans and property would only be sold to white individuals.

The legal power of the Homeowners associations was furthered when entering into administrative positions with Mayor Albert Cobo. Cobo opted to have several members of homeowners associations counsel zoning and urban development policies which attempted to further enforce de facto segregation within Detroit. The influence of homeowners associations within the Cobo administration stretched as far as playing an integral role in disbanding the Mayor's Interacial Committee (MIC) which was aimed at facilitating integration within the city, and turning it into the Commission on Community Relations (CCR). The CCR was composed of homeowners association members and perpetuated segregated housing standards by emphasizing rights that belong to white homeowners to resist integration throughout the city. Racism within housing was therefore still intact after it was federally banned through these extralegal loopholes that were spearheaded by white homeowners associations.

The actions of the homeowners associations reflected the deep cultural ties that Detroiters developed within their neighborhoods. Historians have previously connected homeowners associations’ efforts to prevent integration to be tied to the sense of identity within the segregated neighborhoods in Detroit. Since the housing shortage affected both white and black populations, people clung onto aspects of their community for the feeling of security within housing. Segregated Detroit neighborhoods facilitated for this feeling of safety and stability to then be linked to race. Once this sentiment of safety was threatened with integration of black residents who have been construed as dangerous and inhumane, the agency of white homeowners associations was actualized.

===== Predatory Inclusion =====
In 1968, the HUD Act was passed by the federal government to address the problems of housing availability and residential segregation that constrained the agency of African Americans. The HUD Act mandated the production of 10 million units of new and renovated housing within a decade and also guaranteed that the federal government would pay the full mortgage of any foreclosed homes. This incentivized real estate and mortgage bankers to sell homes to individuals they believed were likely to miss mortgage payments. Single black mothers on welfare were often targeted for this reason. Real estate companies used the existing poverty and inadequate housing conditions that redlining created as excuses to sell homes to African Americans at disproportionately higher prices. The HUD Act therefore led to this vicious, predatory cycle of real estate companies selling homes at a very elevated price to poor, black families so they could eventually foreclose the home, get federal money to cover their losses, and sell the home to the next desperate family.

==== 1943 Riot ====
Postwar tensions and animosities culminated in the race riots of 1943. This riot started with a conflict among young men at Belle Isle, and it quickly spread into the city, inciting violence between whites and blacks. Although at the time blacks were largely blamed for the violence, studies have found that many young armed whites traveled across the city to attack majority-black areas east of Woodward Avenue. By contrast, blacks arrested in the riot tended to be mature family men who had lived longer in the city and were defending their homes. The riot ended when 6,000 soldiers of the United States Army intervened to keep the peace and order in the city. As a result of this riot, white citizens learned to use violence to gain leverage in political and housing contentions.

==== Civil Rights Movement ====
The civil rights movement in the South affected minorities in northern and western states as well. In Detroit, activists pushed for more representation in local government, including the white-dominated police force, and for equal justice in housing and employment. At the same time, African Americans were proud of their progress in Detroit. In 1965 the Charles H. Wright Museum of African American History was founded in the city.

According to columnist Keith Richburg, in the 1960s a social divide developed between the many black people from Alabama and those from South Carolina; they lived east and west of Woodward Avenue, respectively. The migrants from South Carolina believed they were more refined than those from Alabama, who were from rural areas and thought to be lower class. Richburg described the divide as "more psychological than geographic".

From 1950 to 1970 de facto racial segregation in the Metro Detroit area increased. Those white people who were more established economically moved out of the city to newly developed suburbs, which often were divided by class and income levels. In that period black growth in the suburbs averaged 2.7%, while in previous decades it had been 5%. Social tensions increased as blacks felt oppressed by discrimination, a majority-white police force, and restricted housing. Resentments erupted in the widespread destruction and violence in black neighborhoods of the Detroit riot of 1967, considered the worst in urban America. That summer similar riots erupted in numerous cities across the country. Both middle-class whites and blacks began to leave Detroit in greater number. Following the assassination of Martin Luther King Jr. in April 1968, there was renewed violence in a civil disturbance along 12th Street, the center of the 1967 unrest. It was quickly controlled. In the 1970s, the number of middle-class blacks moving to the suburbs increased, as they also sought newer housing, better schools, and neighborhoods with less poverty and crime.

==== Auto Industry ====
Pressures on the auto industry and restructuring of heavy manufacturing across the region caused high job losses, adding to the strains of the city. Overall population in the metro area declined, with many people moving to other areas for work. Detroit suffered concentrated poverty in sections, where people were unable to leave. The quality of schools declined, creating a cycle that appeared to trap people in place. The city struggled to support those in need at a time of declining revenues.

==== Demographic Changes and Suburbanization ====
By 1970 Detroit and six other municipalities, Ecorse, Highland Park, Inkster, Pontiac, River Rouge, and Royal Oak Township, had higher than average black populations. The six suburban municipalities with higher than average black populations held a total of 78.5% of the suburban black people in the tri-county area. During this suburbanization period, many middle-class blacks also moved from Detroit to Southfield. Suburban development and growth increased among all populations, and blacks became more widely distributed.

By 2000, blacks in the six suburban municipalities that had held the great majority in 1970 made up only 34% of the blacks in the suburbs. From 1990 to 2000, black people migrating to the suburbs constituted almost half of the total population growth there. In the decade 1990–2000, the highest number of blacks moved into the Detroit suburbs of any decade in the 20th century. In that decade, the black population of Southfield increased by more than 20,000 people. At the same time, the total number of black people in Detroit decreased for the first time in the city's history. But other ethnic decreases resulted in black people in the city making up a higher percentage of its overall population: from 76% to 82%. As of 2002, a total of 90% of the black population in Wayne, Macomb, and Oakland counties resided in Detroit, Highland Park, Inkster, Pontiac, and Southfield.

Migration of black families out of Detroit continued. By 2010 Southfield became 70% black. In 2010 9% of Macomb County's population was black, and the black population in Warren from 2000 to 2010 increased from 4,000 to 18,000. By 2011 black suburbanization had increased across the area, as blacks settled in more different localities. By 2011 black suburbanization had increased across the metro region, no longer limited to a few communities. From 2000 to 2010, Detroit had lost around 200,000 people, as many families continued to leave the ailing city.

The housing market in Metro Detroit declined during the Great Recession, enabling some blacks to move into areas that had previously been too expensive. At the same time, many white suburbanites were unable to sell their houses so stayed in place, resulting in the development of more integrated neighborhoods. Mark Binelli, author of Detroit City is the Place to Be, wrote "In a funny way, the recession had helped this integration along." Some suburban residents, including middle-class blacks, resented the new arrivals, feeling they brought unwelcome patterns of behavior that disrupted the peace of the suburbs.

From 2000 to circa 2023, the African-American population declined by 295,000. In 2010, 82.2% of the people living in Detroit were black, and it was the large American city with the highest percentage of black people. By 2023 this percentage was down to 77.2%, and so there were other major cities with higher percentages of black people.

== Institutions ==
- NAACP of Detroit.
- KICK is an organization that serves LGBT African Americans.
- The Detroit Association of Black Organizations, (DABO), Inc.

== Media ==
The Michigan Chronicle and The Michigan FrontPage, both owned by the company Real Times, serve the African-American community.

== Recreation ==
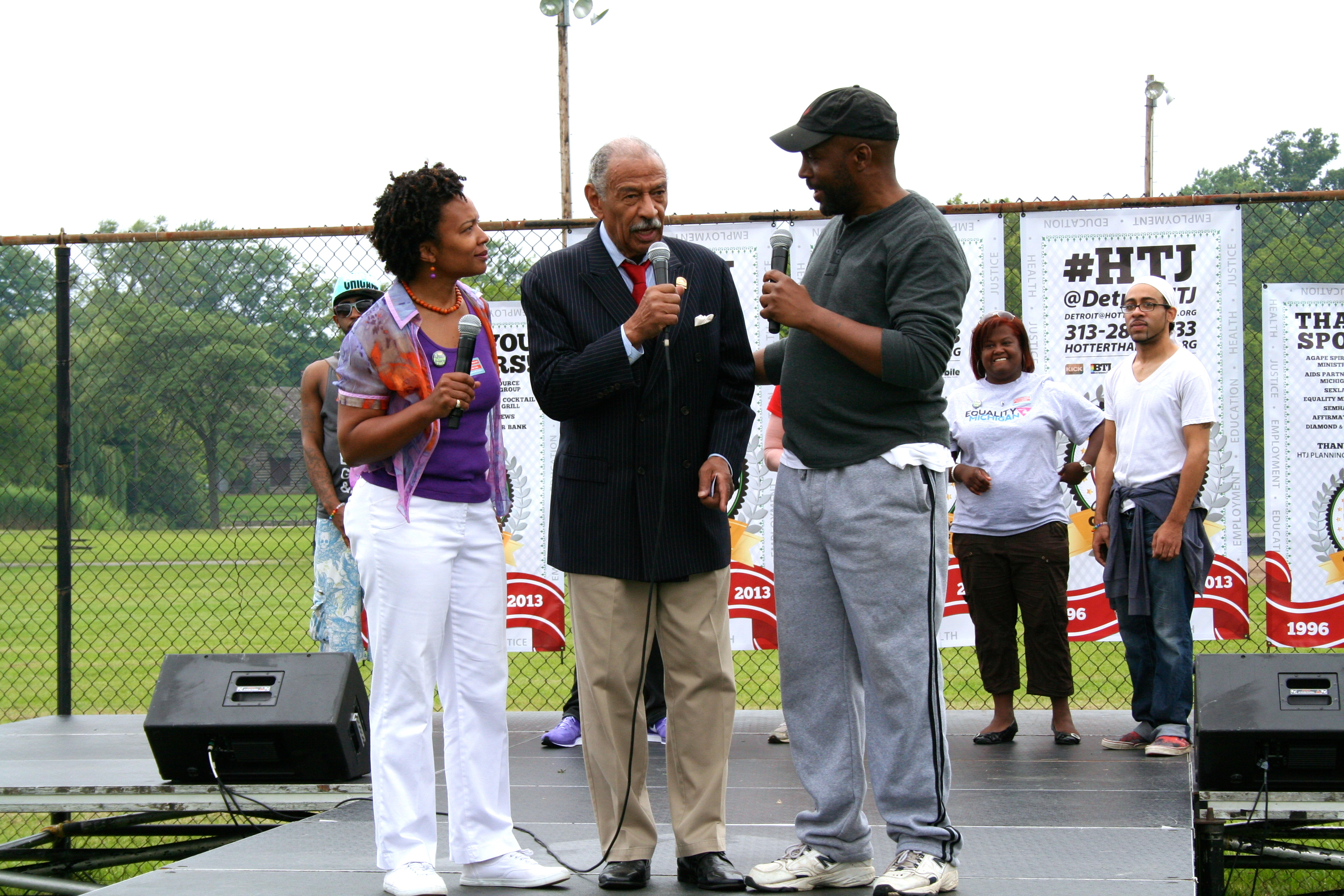
Congressman John Conyers speaking on stage alongside Alicia Skillman (l) and Curtis Lipscomb (r) during Hotter Than July 2013 in Detroit, Michigan's Palmer Park

The "Hotter than July" annual LGBT festival is held in the park Palmer Park; the festival states that it caters to the "black same-gender-loving".

A Buffalo Soldiers museum is located in western Detroit, near Rouge Park. It interprets the history of African-American soldiers who fought in the West.

Ruth Ellis, a black lesbian, held house parties at her residence, "The Spot". It became a socializing place for black lesbians and gay men, allowing them to avoid heterosexism and racism in their society. Ellis, who was featured in the documentary Living With Pride, was the oldest-known black woman who identified as a lesbian until her death in October 2001. She lived in Detroit until her death.

== Politics ==
In the 2020 United States presidential election in Michigan African-Americans in Detroit were a major demographic contributing to Joe Biden winning that state. The same happened in the 2020 United States Senate election in Michigan in regards for Gary Peters.

== Notable people ==
- Dennis Archer (Mayor of Detroit)
- Dave Bing (Mayor of Detroit)
- James Boggs
- Gary Brown (Michigan politician)
- Kenneth Cockrel, Jr.
- John Conyers
- Monica Conyers
- Demetrius and Terry Flenory
- LZ Granderson (journalist)
- Carolyn Cheeks Kilpatrick
- Kwame Kilpatrick (Mayor of Detroit)
- Charles Pugh
- Ossian Sweet
- Jimmy Womack
- Coleman Young (Mayor of Detroit)
- Big Sean
- 42 Dugg
- Tee Grizzley
- Kash Doll
- Sada Baby
- Diana Ross
- Ben Carson
- Jalen Rose
- Berry Gordy

== See also ==
- History of Detroit
- Demographics of Metro Detroit
- Black Bottom, Detroit
- Hotter than July (festival)
- History of slavery in Michigan
- History of Mexican Americans in Metro Detroit
- History of the Appalachian people in Metro Detroit
- History of the Hmong Americans in Metro Detroit
- History of Hungarian Americans in Metro Detroit
- History of the Albanian Americans in Metro Detroit
- History of Chinese Americans in Metro Detroit
- History of Italian Americans in Metro Detroit
- History of Greek Americans in Metro Detroit
- History of Indian Americans in Metro Detroit
- History of the Belgian Americans in Metro Detroit
- History of Polish Americans in Metro Detroit
- History of the Middle Eastern people in Metro Detroit
- History of the Jews in Metro Detroit
- White flight
