= Real Times =

Newspaper publisher

Real Times Media LLC
- Type: Private
- Founded: January 2003
- Headquarters: Buhl Building, Suite 1300, 535 Griswold Street, Detroit, Michigan 48226, United States
- Area served: Atlanta, Chicago, Detroit, Memphis, Pittsburgh metro areas
- Products: Weekly newspapers and other publications catering to the African-American community
- Website: RealTimesMedia.com

Real Times Media LLC is the owner and publisher of the Chicago Defender, the largest and most influential African American weekly newspaper, as well as five other regional weeklies in the eastern and Midwestern United States. Its headquarters are in Midtown Detroit.

The company was founded in January 2003 by a consortium of Chicago and Detroit business leaders to take over the assets of Sengstacke Enterprises Inc., the longtime owner of five of the papers.

== History ==
=== Sengstacke Enterprises ===
Robert Sengstacke Abbott founded the Chicago Defender in 1905, billing it the "World's Greatest Weekly". The Defender served the growing African-American community of Chicago, which was often ignored by the mainstream newspapers of the day. Sengstacke also used the Defender as a means to grow the community, writing stories about Northern city life that enticed African-American residents of the Southern United States to move to Chicago, a phenomenon that came to be known as the Great Migration. Like other giants of the contemporary Historical Black Press Foundation, the Defender enjoyed substantial circulation across the nation.

Abbott's nephew John H. Sengstacke, who became publisher in 1940, was a founder of the National Negro Publishers Association, later renamed the National Newspaper Publishers Association (NNPA), which now has 200 member black newspapers.

On February 6, 1956, the Defender became a daily newspaper and changed its name to the Chicago Daily Defender, the nation's second black daily newspaper (after the Atlanta Daily World, founded in 1928). It published as a daily until 2003, when new owners converted the Defender back to a weekly.

Sengstacke also built his newspaper into a chain. He had previously established the Michigan Chronicle in Detroit in 1936, and turned the Chicago paper's Memphis bureau into the Tri-State Defender weekly newspaper in 1951. In 1965, he purchased the assets of the recently defunct Pittsburgh Courier and started the New Pittsburgh Courier

This chain became known as Sengstacke Enterprises Inc., or SEI. Following Sengstacke's death in 1997, SEI was held in a family trust until 2003, when it was sold for nearly $12 million to Real Times, a group of investors with several business and family ties to Sengstacke.

=== Real Times ===
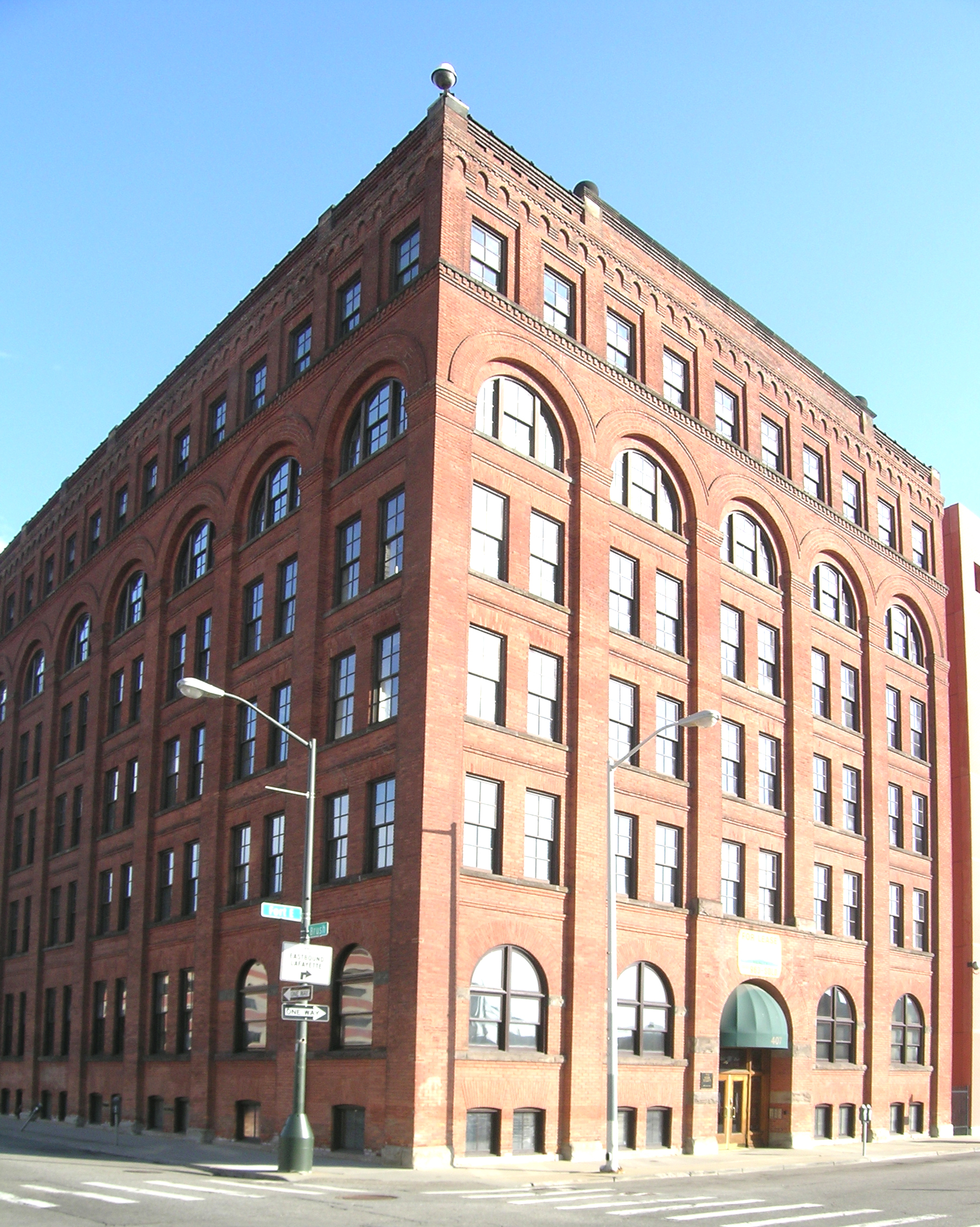
The Globe Tobacco Building at one time housed the company headquarters

Amid the uncertainty over the SEI papers' futures—Sengstacke had left instructions that the papers were to be sold upon his death, but the search for the right buyer took six years—longtime Michigan Chronicle publisher Sam Logan left the paper in 2000 and in May of that year formed a competing weekly, The Michigan FrontPage. Logan was one of the investors in Real Times, and the company continued to publish FrontPage alongside the four Sengstacke titles.

In 2012, the Atlanta Daily World – which, despite its name, is now published weekly – merged with Real Times; its publisher said the sale would give the World more multimedia resources, calling it "truly a new beginning for the paper."

In June 2024, influential Real Times Media co-owner William Pickard died.

== Corporate affairs ==
The company has its headquarters in Midtown Detroit. At one time its headquarters were in the Globe Tobacco Building in Downtown Detroit, and later the Buhl Building in Downtown Detroit.

== Holdings ==
Real Times publishes seven newspapers in five different markets:

- Atlanta Daily World (website) of Atlanta, Georgia
- Chicago Defender (website) of Chicago, Illinois
- Michigan Chronicle (website) of Detroit, Michigan
- The Michigan FrontPage of Detroit, Michigan
- New Pittsburgh Courier (website) of Pittsburgh, Pennsylvania
- Atlanta Tribune: The Magazine/ATM (website) of Atlanta, Georgia

The company also owns RTM Digital Studios, a videography company, and a large archive of newspaper clippings, artifacts and photographs connected with African-American history.

In 2009, Real Times purchased Who's Who Publishing Company of Columbus, Ohio, which publishes biographical and networking guides for and about African American businesspeople in 25 cities across the country.

== See also ==
- History of the African-Americans in Metro Detroit
