= Atlanta Daily World =

American newspaper, founded 1928

- Type: Weekly newspaper
- Owner: Real Times Inc.
- Founder: William Alexander Scott II
- Founded: August 5, 1928; 98 years ago, as Atlanta World
- Headquarters: 100 Hartsfield Parkway Atlanta, Georgia 30344, United States
- ISSN: 1528-6142
- Website: atlantadailyworld.com

The Atlanta Daily World is the oldest black newspaper in Atlanta, Georgia, founded in 1928. Currently owned by Real Times Inc., it publishes daily online. It was "one of the earliest and most influential black newspapers."

== History ==
=== Establishment ===
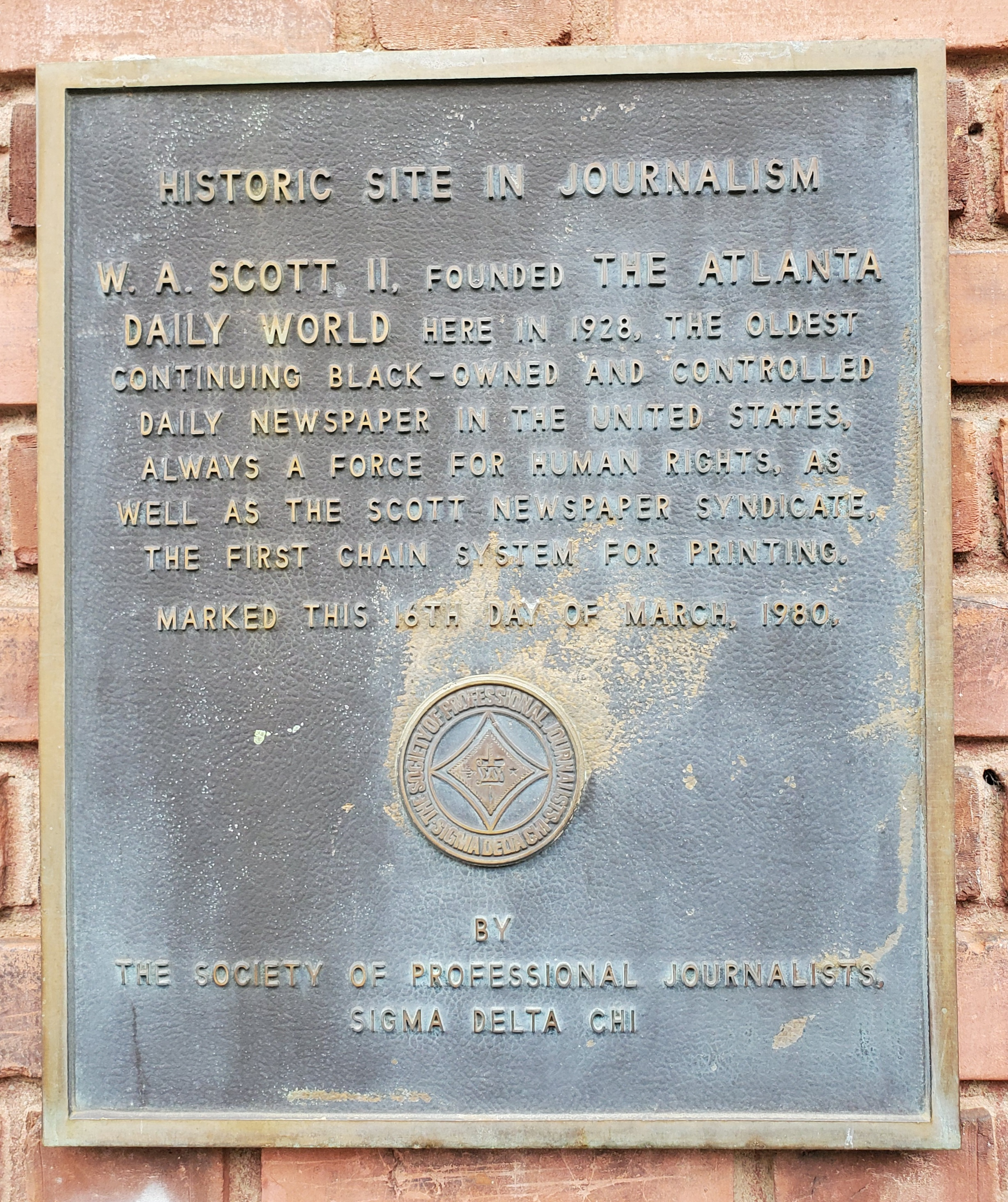
Historical marker for the Atlanta Daily World

It was founded as the weekly Atlanta World on August 5, 1928, by William Alexander Scott II who was only 26 at the time. Scott was a Morehouse graduate who later worked as the only black clerk on the Jacksonville to Washington, D.C., rail line, then in 1927 published a Jacksonville business directory to help blacks find each other. A year later he published a similar directory for Atlanta.

At the time, there was very little coverage of black educational institutions, businesses, prominent persons, churches, or other news of significance; the exceptions being crime news and death listings. This was despite the fact that Atlanta contained at the time the most prominent black educational institutions and persons of influence in the country. Whites lived to a large extent sealed off from black Atlanta and only interacted with blacks in service positions, virtually unaware of the black institutions and achievements taking place only a mile or two from their homes.

The paper became a semi-weekly in May 1930, and a daily in 1931. In 1931, Scott also began publishing the Chattanooga Tribune and Memphis World, and by doing so, founded the first chain of black newspapers, a chain that would eventually grow, at its peak, to fifty publications.

=== Daily publication ===
In 1932 Scott's Atlanta World became a daily and added "Daily" to its title, becoming the first black daily in the U.S. in the 20th century and the first successful one in all U.S. history. At the time of its founding, the only other black paper in the area was the Atlanta Independent, which ceased publication in 1933. This left the Daily World as the only black paper in town. Its offices were on Auburn Avenue ("Sweet Auburn") celebrated as the home of the black business, social, and religious community and famously called by John Wesley Dobbs the "richest Negro street in the world".

On February 4, 1934, Scott was shot and killed; no one was ever convicted of the crime. His brother, Cornelius Adolphus (C.A.) Scott, took over as head of the paper, which subsequently adopted a more conservative, Republican position, reflecting Cornelius' own political views and his resentment over the Democrats' historical support of segregation and bias against African-Americans.

=== Civil Rights Movement ===
During the Civil Rights Movement, the Daily World was criticized for not supporting sit-ins staged at several white-owned restaurants in downtown Atlanta. Advertisers threatened to pull their business if the demonstrations did not stop. C.A. Scott thought the demonstrations were dangerous, would work against the participants when they later would be looking for jobs, and reasoned that blacks would more effectively improve their situation by working towards ending segregation in education, obtaining political and voting influence, and improving their economic situations.

Editorial content during this period was mainly neutral in tone, as opposed to actively promoting Negro rights or attacking racism, and as such white businesses did not feel threatened by its content, allowing the Daily World to secure advertising support from companies such as Coca-Cola, Sears, Roebuck and Rich's, the largest department store in the city.

The paper did urge blacks to shop at black-owned businesses (the "Don't Buy Where You Can't Work" campaign). In the 1940s it sponsored voter registration efforts. The paper also covered the Atlanta black community's social, church, and sports news.

The Daily World covered, on a national basis, topics including:

- Lynchings
- Police brutality
- Capital punishment
- the trials of the Scottsboro Boys, nine black Alabama teenagers accused of rape
- Racial discrimination in the federal government
- the white primary system in Georgia (abolished 1946)
- School segregation
- Racial discrimination against African-Americans in the U.S. Military during World War II.

=== 21st century ===
Cornelius Scott retired in 1997 and his great niece, Alexis Scott Reeves, took over as publisher. Reeves has previously been a journalist at the Atlanta Journal-Constitution, Atlanta's leading daily, and later vice-president of community affairs there.

During the 1980s and 1990s, the newspaper's circulation declined from its peak over 20,000 in the 1960s to a steady 10,000. By 2000, although it retained the word "Daily" in its name, it had cut back its publication schedule to only two editions per week, on Sundays and Thursdays.

In 2012, the Atlanta Daily World joined Real Times Inc., a publisher of five other African-American weeklies, including the Chicago Defender and New Pittsburgh Courier. Alexis Scott said the sale would give the World more multimedia resources, calling it "truly a new beginning for the paper."

== Historic offices ==
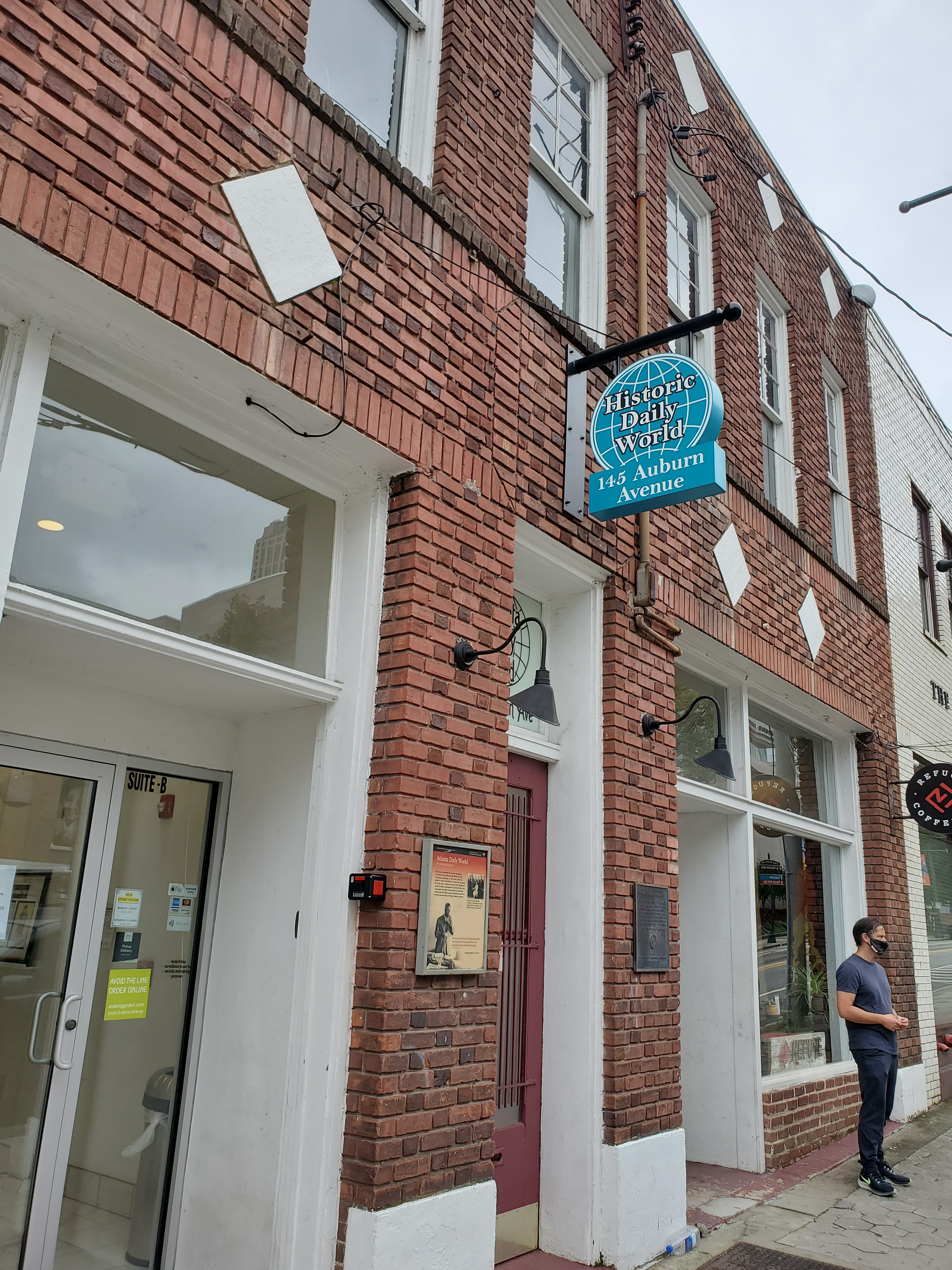
Historic offices on Auburn Avenue

In 2008, the Downtown Atlanta tornado damaged the World's offices at 145 Auburn Avenue. The paper's operations subsequently moved to another location. In 2012, Scott announced plans to sell the building where this important part of Atlanta's black history took place; the buyer had plans to demolish the building. This caused outcry in the local Old Fourth Ward neighborhood at the loss of yet another historic building on Auburn Avenue. The Historic District Development Corporation, whose mission is historic preservation in the Martin Luther King Jr. Historic District launched an online petition to save the building. Owner and publisher Alexis Scott responded in a joint statement with developer Integral Group claiming that demolition of the building but saving the façade was the only feasible option to preserve any portion of the historic structure and thus preserve the history in some physical form.

On January 8, 2014, the offices were sold to commercial real estate developer and Sidewalk Radio host Gene Kansas who stated that he planned to restore the building for retail and residential use, and that it would be designed by Gamble and Gamble architects, the same firm redesigning the Clermont Motor Inn on Ponce de Leon Avenue in Poncey-Highland into a boutique hotel. The refurbished building features two retail spaces with two apartments above, and reopened on March 12, 2015.

== Firsts ==
- First black daily in the 20th century; first successful black daily ever
- First black newspaper with assigned White House correspondent: Harry S. Alpin, February 1944
- One of the first black newspapers to report black-on-black crimes
- First black newspaper to have its name on a major airport newsstand. Three Atlanta Daily World newsstands opened at Hartsfield-Jackson Atlanta Airport in 2009.

== See also ==
- African Americans in Atlanta
