= The Michigan FrontPage =

US weekly newspaper

- Type: Weekly newspaper
- Owner: Real Times Inc.
- Publisher: Hiram Jackson
- Founded: May 2000
- Headquarters: 479 Ledyard Street, Detroit, Michigan, United States
- Circulation: 9,838 weekly (as of 2011)

The Michigan FrontPage is a weekly African-American newspaper based in Detroit, Michigan, serving the African-American community. It was founded in 2000 by a former publisher of the Michigan Chronicle and has been owned by the Chronicle's parent company, Real Times Inc., since 2003. Its headquarters are in the Real Times offices in Midtown Detroit.

Chicago Defender and Michigan Chronicle owner John H. Sengstacke died in 1997. Amid the uncertainty over the Chronicle's future ownership, longtime publisher Sam Logan left the paper in 2000 and in May of that year formed a competing weekly, The Michigan FrontPage, which he envisioned as "a weekend read", published on Fridays.

The Sengstacke papers were finally sold in 2003, to Real Times Inc., a group of African-American business leaders from Chicago and Detroit, including Logan. Logan returned as publisher of both the Chronicle and the FrontPage, which became part of the group.

Logan died in late December 2011. Hiram Jackson, president of Real Times Inc., was appointed interim publisher in his place.

Real Times Inc. describes the FrontPage as "a contemporary, magazine-style 'weekend' newspaper designed to cultivate and be the public face of a progressive urban image and lifestyle."

== See also ==
- History of the African-Americans in Metro Detroit
