= Michigan Chronicle =

Newspaper in Detroit, Michigan

- Type: Weekly newspaper
- Owner: Real Times Inc.
- Publisher: Hiram Jackson
- Editor: Jeremy Allen
- Founded: 1936, as Detroit Chronicle
- Headquarters: 1452 Randolph St #400, Detroit, Michigan, 48226 U.S.
- Circulation: 27,000 weekly (as of 2015)
- Readership: 120,000 weekly in 2015
- Website: michronicleonline.com

The Michigan Chronicle is a weekly African-American newspaper based in Detroit, Michigan. It was founded in 1936 by John H. Sengstacke, editor of the Chicago Defender. Together with the Defender and a handful of other African-American newspapers, it is owned by Detroit-based Real Times Inc. Its headquarters are in the Real Times offices in Midtown Detroit.

== Early history ==
The Chronicle's first editor was Louis E. Martin, whom Sengstacke sent to Detroit on June 6, giving him a $5.00 raise above his $15-per-week salary at the Chicago Defender, $10 in cash and a one-way bus ticket. The Chronicle's first issue had a circulation of 5,000 copies. In 1944, long-time publisher Longworth Quinn joined Martin at the Chronicle. Quinn became a leader in Detroit's African-American business and church groups, and those groups supported the Chronicle.

The Chronicle garnered national attention in its early years for its "radical" approach to politics -- advocacy of organized labor and the Democratic Party. Albert Dunmore, who edited the Detroit edition of the Pittsburgh Courier in the 1940s, remarked in 2010 that most African-American newspapers of the time took the opposite stance, because of "the anti-Black attitude prevalent in the organized labor ranks and the heavily southern influence in the Democratic Party".

James Ingram of the Michigan Chronicle was one of several negotiators involved in the Attica Prison Riots in September 1971.

In 2001, Detroit City Council member Kay Everett credited the Michigan Chronicle with having played a key role in local civil rights struggles of the 20th century, such as supporting the election of Mayor Coleman A. Young and, especially, reporting on violence against African Americans:

"It was a lone voice in the wilderness when police brutality against African Americans was commonplace", Everett wrote. "Its coverage of STRESS, the Detroit Police Department's controversial undercover unit, should have won the paper a Pulitzer Prize. During STRESS's four-year run, White STRESS officers shot and killed 23 young Black men. Most shot in the back. The Michigan Chronicle was the only newspaper in the city that told the truth about the killings."

Originally located at 1727 St. Antoine Street, the Michigan Chronicle is now located at 1452 Randolph St #400, Detroit, Michigan, 48226 U.S.

== New owners ==
Sengstacke Enterprises Inc., publisher of the Chronicle and the daily Defender, would later also include the New Pittsburgh Courier and the Tri-State Defender in Tennessee. When Sengstacke died in 1997, the Chronicle was described as his most profitable newspaper, "fat with local and national advertising", with a weekly circulation of 43,582. Inheritance tax bills and provisions in Sengstacke's will made it likely that the chain would be sold, but it was administered by a trust in the interim.

Amid the uncertainty over the Chronicle's ownership, longtime publisher Sam Logan left the paper in 2000 and in May of that year formed a competing weekly, The Michigan FrontPage, which he envisioned as "a weekend read", published on Fridays.

The Chronicle and its sister papers were finally sold in 2003, to Real Times Inc., a group of African-American business leaders from Chicago and Detroit. Logan returned as publisher of both the Chronicle and the FrontPage, which became part of the group.

Logan died in late December 2011. Hiram Jackson, president of Real Times Inc., was appointed interim publisher in his place.

In June 2024, Real Times and Michigan Chronicle co-owner William Pickard died. Pickard was known for being influential businessman in Detroit, where Real Times Media and the Michigan Chronicle are headquartered.

== See also ==
- History of the African-Americans in Metro Detroit
