= L. Alex Wilson =

American journalist (1909–1960)

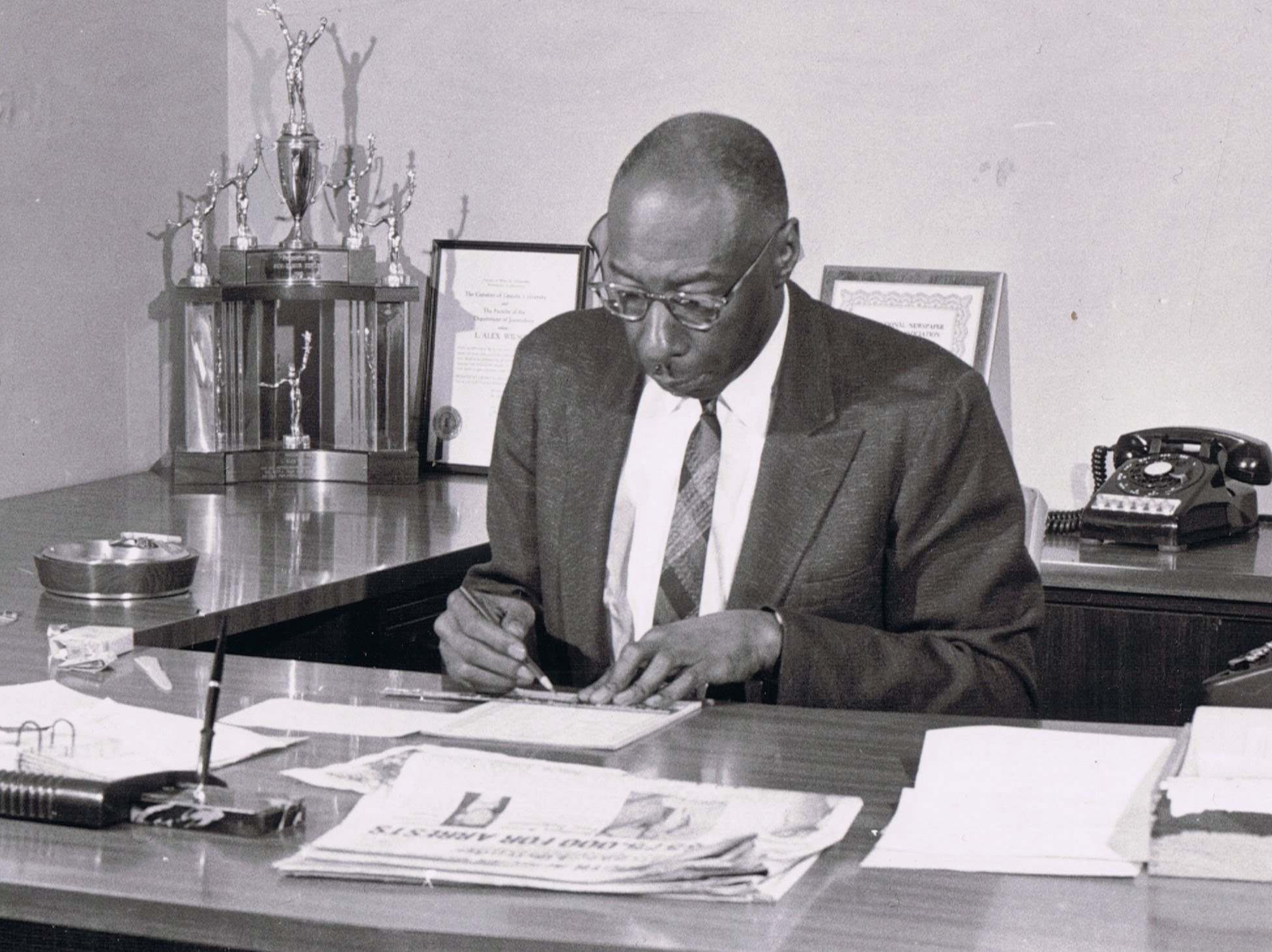
L. Alex Wilson in Chicago Defender office c. 1960

L. Alex Wilson (March 30, 1909–October 11, 1960) was an American journalist and editor who rose to prominence during the civil rights movement. He covered the Emmett Till murder for the African-American-oriented Chicago Defender chain, while serving as the editor of the Memphis-based Tri-State Defender. In 1957, Wilson was covering the federally enforced integration of Central High School by the Little Rock Nine when a white mob assaulted him and two other Black journalists. He survived, continuing as an editor in Chicago, but died three years later from neurological damage caused by the violent segregationists in Little Rock.

== Biography ==
Lucious Alexander Wilson was the editor and general manager of the Tri-State Defender, an African-American newspaper published in Memphis, Tennessee. The Tri-State Defender was then part of the influential Chicago Defender chain. In 1950, Wilson went overseas for the Chicago Defender to report on African-American soldiers and sailors in the Korean War. In 1955, Wilson led the Defender-chain's coverage of the Emmett Till lynching, a catalyst for the civil rights movement. One of the people he hired at the Tri-State Defender was Dorothy Butler Gilliam.

Wilson gained national attention when television images of him being beaten by a White mob were broadcast during his coverage of school desegregation by the Little Rock Nine, who were finally entering Little Rock Central High School on September 23, 1957. Wilson, a highly visible presence at 6'3", and two other Black reporters arrived before the Black students. When they stepped out of the car they were in, the racist mob started to attacked them. Wilson decided to walk, not run, away. After having been confronted by members of the KKK when he was younger and fleeing, he decided he would never run from racism ever again. A member of the mob jumped on his back and started choking him, and another one hit him in the head with a brick.

Wilson returned to Chicago to become editor of The Chicago Defender, but he died at 51, from Parkinson's disease exacerbated by the assault in Little Rock.
