= Tri-State Defender =

African-American newspaper in Memphis, Tennessee

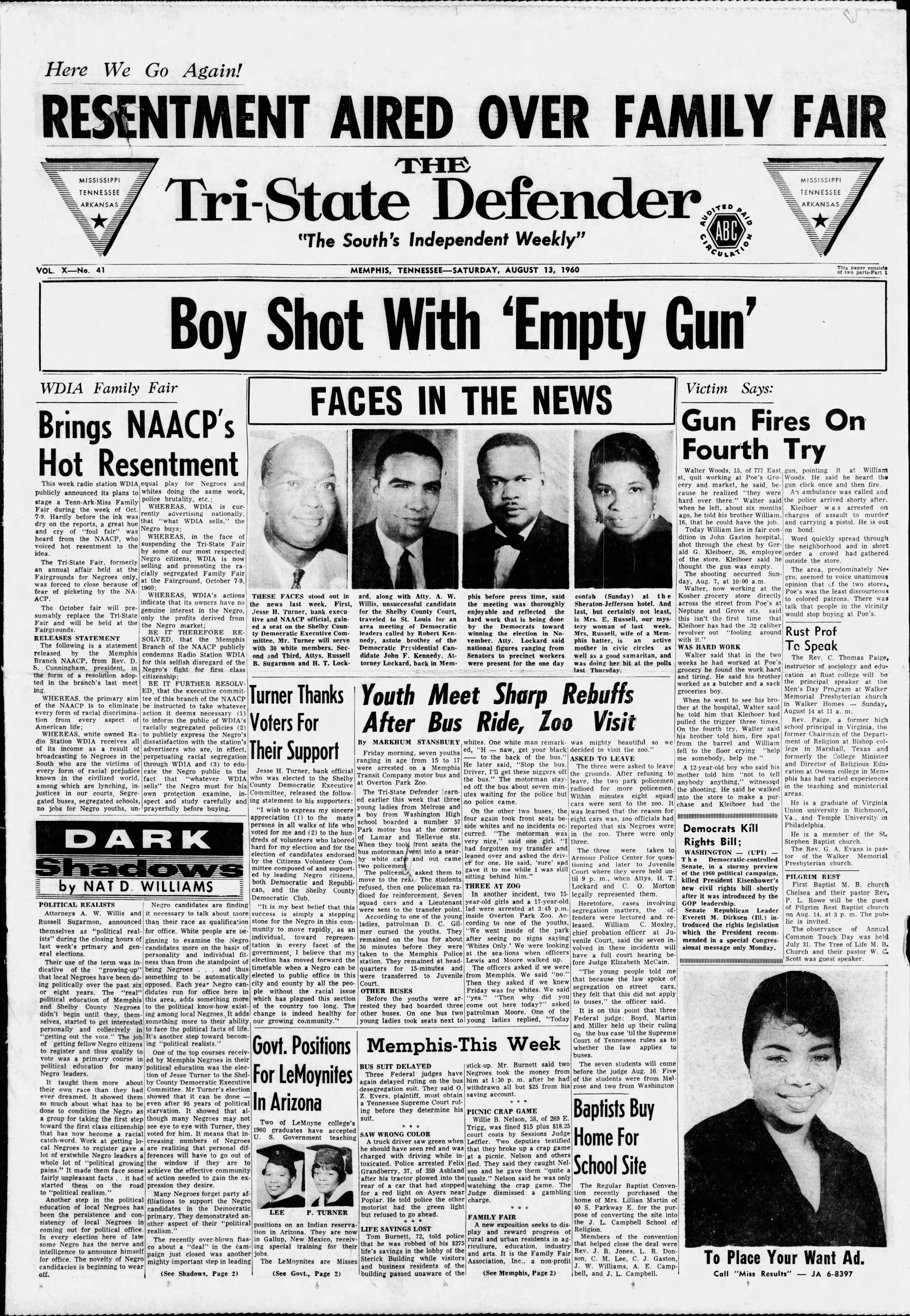
- A representative front page of the Defender in August 1960
- Type: Weekly newspaper
- Owner: Tri-State Defender Board of Directors
- Publisher: Calvin Anderson
- Editor: Stephanie R. Jones
- Founded: November 3, 1951
- Headquarters: Memphis, Tennessee 38103, U.S.
- Circulation: 4,373 weekly (as of 2011)
- Website: tsdmemphis.com

The Tri-State Defender is a weekly African-American newspaper serving Memphis, Tennessee, and the nearby areas of Arkansas, Mississippi and Tennessee. It bills itself as "The Mid-South's Best Alternative Newspaper". The Defender was founded in 1951 by John H. Sengstacke, owner of the Chicago Defender. In 2013, the paper was locally purchased from Real Times Media by the Tri-State Defender Board of Directors.

== History ==
Sengstacke's Chicago Defender circulated widely across the Southern United States, but Sengstacke in the early 1950s identified Memphis as a particularly attractive market, where several African-American newspapers had failed to take root and a startup would face only one competitor, The Memphis World, which had begun in 1931 (and would continue publishing until 1961).

In November 1951, Sengstacke and editor Lewis O. Swingler, the former editor of the World, published the first edition of the Tri-State Defender, adopting the slogan "The South's Independent Weekly". The 20-page inaugural edition included "The Tri-State Defender Ten Point Program", consisting of vows "to broadcast to the world the achievements of all the citizens it serves", "to join hands with all citizens regardless of creed or color who wish to develop better human relations and to advance the principals of American Democracy", and "to uphold those Christian principles which under gird our republic", among others. Swingler served as editor in chief until 1955.

Editor L. Alex Wilson and his Tri-State Defender journalists led coverage of the 1955 murder of Emmett Till, an African-American teen from Illinois who was killed in Mississippi after allegedly flirting with a white woman. Their stories and photographs dominated both their own paper and the Chicago Defender for weeks, and the trial became a media sensation and landmark event in the Civil Rights Movement. Wilson' s coverage of the Civil Rights Movement had a more powerful editorial influence than its competitor, The Memphis World, on the Memphis black community.

The Tri-State Defender in its first 50 years was part of Sengstacke Enterprises Inc., a chain of prominent African-American publications, which in the 1990s included the flagship Chicago Daily Defender, the Michigan Chronicle and the New Pittsburgh Courier. Following Sengstacke's death in 1997, the four-paper chain was held in a family trust until 2003, when it was sold for nearly $12 million to Real Times, a group of investors with several business and family ties to Sengstacke.
