= Hazel Garland =

American journalist

Hazel B. Garland
- Born: Hazel Barbara Maxine Hill; January 28, 1913; Terre Haute, Indiana, US
- Died: April 5, 1988 (aged 75); McKeesport, Pennsylvania, US
- Spouse: Percy A. Garland (m. 1935)
- Children: 1

Hazel B. Garland (January 28, 1913 – April 5, 1988) was a journalist, columnist and newspaper editor. She was the first African-American woman to serve as editor-in-chief of a nationally circulated newspaper chain (the New Pittsburgh Courier). Born into a farming family, she was the eldest of 16 children. Although a bright and capable student, she dropped out of high school at her fathers instigation, and spent time working as a maid in order to provide financial assistance to her family.

After her marriage in 1935 she became a housewife, raising her daughter Phyllis and playing an active role in various voluntary organisations. Her reports of club activities gained her attention from local newspaper editors and by 1943 she was writing a regular column. In 1946 she joined the staff of the Pittsburgh Courier full-time, and by 1960 she was editor of both the entertainment and the women's sections of the newspaper. In 1955 she became the first African-American journalist to write a regular television column, Video Vignettes, which would go on to become one of the longest running television columns in newspaper history. In 1974 Garland was made editor-in-chief, and in the same year she was named 'Editor of the Year' by the National Newspaper Publishers Association. She retired from her editorial role in 1977 due to health problems, although she continued writing and remained in an advisory role to the publishers until her death in 1988. In 1978 and 1979 she served as a juror for the Pulitzer Prize for journalism.

== Personal life ==
Hazel B. Garland was born Hazel Barbara Maxine Hill near Terre Haute, Indiana, in 1913. She was the eldest of 16 children born to George and Hazel Hill, who were at that time farmers. After moving to Pennsylvania in the early 1920s, her father began working as a coal miner and the family eventually settled in Belle Vernon in 1932. As the eldest child, Hill was called on to assist her mother in raising her 15 younger siblings. She was an enthusiastic and talented student, and had hoped to continue with her education. However, before she could complete high school, her father requested that she drop out to allow a younger brother to continue, with the intention of his eventually attending college. Hill found work as a maid, while her younger brother would eventually refuse a college scholarship in favour of a failed relationship. Hill later recalled that her father was not in favour of female education, stating that it was a waste of money as they would eventually get married and stop working anyway.

Although no longer attending school, Hill spent her spare time in the local library reading. She also spent time in the evenings dancing, singing and playing the drums for local bands, and for a short time considered a career in entertainment. While at a party, she met Percy Andrew Garland, a window display decorator and photographer from McKeesport, Pennsylvania. It was, however, during a church program when Garland played a trombone solo that they fell in love. On January 26, 1935, they were married and their only child, Phyllis, was born in October of that year. Throughout her career, Garland credited her family for supporting her achievements and encouraging her dedication to the paper.

Garland was a fan of the Pittsburgh Steelers football team. In 1951, Garland became a member of the Pittsburgh chapter of The Girl Friend's, Inc., a prestigious African American women's civic society. Along with her friend and colleague Toki Schalk Johnson, in 1961 Garland became one of the first African-American members of the Women's Press Club of Pittsburgh.

She died on April 5, 1988, aged 75, in McKeesport Hospital due to a heart attack after surgery on a cerebral aneurysm.

== Journalism career ==
=== Early career ===
After her marriage, Garland settled into life as a housewife and mother. With support from her mother-in-law she also became active in local voluntary organisations. As she was a keen writer, Garland was often asked to act as club reporter. In 1943 she was on the publicity committee for the local YWCA when the reporter due to cover a tea held in honour of the first black staff worker at the association became lost on the way and only arrived after the event had finished. As a club reporter, Garland had made her own notes during the afternoon, and was encouraged to write them up and send it to the newspaper. The editors at the Pittsburgh Courier were impressed, and asked her to cover similar community events for them as a stringer, for which she was paid $2 an article. Garland produced so much material that her articles were eventually combined into a column called Tri-City News, which began appearing in the Pittsburgh Courier in late 1943. At the time, mainstream media rarely carried any positive news about African-American communities or accomplishments, and Garland's naturally conversational tone and community-centric focus on weddings, honours, jobs and even tragedies along with her increasing reputation for professionalism, reliability and skilled writing quickly earned her a positive reputation.

=== Columnist and editor ===
By 1946, the Pittsburgh Courier was one of the most widely read black newspapers in the United States, and published a total of 14 editions, both local and national, as well as employing international reporters in cities around the world. That year, the paper offered to begin training some of its stringers to become full-time journalists, an opportunity that Garland was quick to take up. Initially providing vacation cover for other members of staff at the paper, she eventually became a general assignments reporter for the paper. This change was not universally welcomed by all her colleagues however and in one instance one of her male colleagues, resentful of a woman working in what he considered to be a man's job, deliberately sent Garland to cover a murder in a local brothel. Garland, who had never been into such an environment before, was somewhat alarmed, but simply paid another male colleague to accompany her and soon returned with all the details necessary for her story.

In the same year, her column was retitled "Things to Talk About", and continued its community-oriented social coverage and conversational tone. Her contemporary at the paper, Frank E. Bolden, remarked that:

"She would give a wedding in the housing projects the same attention that she would give to one in the upper echelon of what was then called Negro society. When I asked about it, she'd say: "They're all human, and as long as I'm doing this, that's how it's going to stay." The clubs relied heavily on Hazel to write about them, and the religious people too. Family allegiance was a hallmark of her work. She has come from a small town where life centred on the family. I think she wrote with such compassion because she had such strong feeling for her own family."

Originally only covering local events, national or particularly prestigious social events were reported in the paper by Toki Johnson. However, eventually, versions of Things to Talk About would also be printed in both local and national editions of the paper, running right up to the month before Garland's death, for a total of 42 years.

In 1952 the editors decided to start a magazine section, and appointed Garland as feature editor, the first woman at the paper to do so. In the same year, Garland was sent to rural South Carolina to cover the story of Maude E. Callen, a community nurse and midwife serving local black and white communities. Although male reporters were still frequently assigned to the best stories, the nature of this story meant that it considered more suitable for a woman to cover. Garland's subsequent series of reports, entitled The Three I's: Ignorance, Illiteracy and Illegitimacy won a 1953 New York Newspaper Guild Page One Award for Journalism.

"The entries were numbered. They didn't name the newspaper or reporter who wrote it, or mention whether the person was black or white. I won the award for the best series. The prize was awarded at the Page One Ball. Oh, I was so thrilled! And I was shocked, too, because I beat some people who had been perennial winners. One had won a Pulitzer prize the year before and had entered a series. I said that if I don't win anything else again, I had won that."

In 1955 Garland started writing television column called Video Vignettes. At a time when the majority of mainstream TV columnists paid little attention to media diversity, Garland's column made particular note of occasions when black performers or broadcasters were dismissed, or when relevant shows were cancelled. To ensure that her point was made, she would also send copies of her columns to the network and station managers. Although the column largely focused on programs featuring African Americans, it still covered all the popular shows and Garland interviewed actors, writers or producers of any color who happened to be in Pittsburgh, such as actress Eartha Kitt. "Video Vignettes" ran from 1955 to one month before Garland's death in 1988, a total of 33 years, one of the longest-running newspaper television columns in history.

In 1960 Garland was promoted from feature editor to women's editor of the magazine, but a financial recession in Chicago, declining circulation of the Courier and increasing coverage of black issues in mainstream newspapers had led to serious financial problems at the paper. In spite of bouncing pay checks, Garland continued writing for the paper. She commented "I loved the Courier. It was everything to me. I had spent the greater part of my life there, so I wanted to work even if I didn't get paid. I thought maybe we could hold on a keep it together."

=== Editor-in-chief ===
As a result of its financial troubles, in 1966 the Pittsburgh Courier was bought out by John H. Sengstacke, publisher of the Chicago Defender, and renamed the New Pittsburgh Courier. At the time Garland was the editor of both the entertainment and women's sections of the paper, but in 1972 Sengstacke offered her the post of city editor, which was considered a management level role. Not all of her colleagues at the paper agreed with this promotion, and Garland was still subject to some harassment from her co-workers.

In 1974 Garland was promoted again, this time to editor-in-chief, the first African-American woman to do so at any newspaper in the United States. Before she accepted the post, Garland made absolutely sure that the offer was genuine and not a token concession without real authority. The role was a demanding one and Garland spent many hours away from her family, reorganising the paper into a more up to date format, developing new beats and expanding some existing sections to appeal to a broader audience.

Although there had been other women in high-profile positions at the Pittsburgh Courier, Garland was the first to achieve a hands-on management role, and had daily input into the running of the paper. By the time she was promoted to editor, she had been assisting with layout, article illustration and design for a number of years. When asked about it a number of years later, friend and journalist Frank E. Boulden said:

"Without her the Courier would have folded during that period when Sengstacke came in. Under her it became a better prepared product. She didn't appreciate making mediocrity respectable. Hazel was one of two top women in journalism, the other being Ethel Payne of the Chicago Defender."

In the same year she was promoted to editor-in-chief, Garland was also named 'editor of the year' by the National Newspaper Publishers Association. In 1975 she received a National Headliner award from Women in Communications. In 1976 the New Pittsburgh Courier won the John B. Russwurm award for the best national African-American newspaper, for which Garland herself won $500 and a life membership of the NAACP. Garland was also honoured that year by the Jewish women's group ORT America for 'bridging the gap between races'. In 1977 Garland retired from her editorial post due to ill health, but she continued writing her columns and took on an advisory role to Sengstacke one day a week.

== Legacy ==
Hazel Garland was the first African-American woman to work her way from freelance writer to editor-in-chief of a national newspaper. She earned the respect of her colleagues, and where possible she tried to help younger people trying to get into journalism: "Just like others motivated, helped and assisted me, I've tried to do the same with other, especially all the young people coming through the doors at the Courier. I want to give back all the vast knowledge shared with me, by some very, very great people."

When asked to summarise her career, Garland said:

"We tell the stories. We tell the stories of the people. We told the stories of Colored people, we told the stories of Negroes, we told the stories of Black people and now we tell the stories of African-Americans. Does it really matter, sports, social, entertainment, or political. They are all our stories, and if we don't tell it, who will?"
