= Globe Tobacco Building =

- U.S. National Register of Historic Places
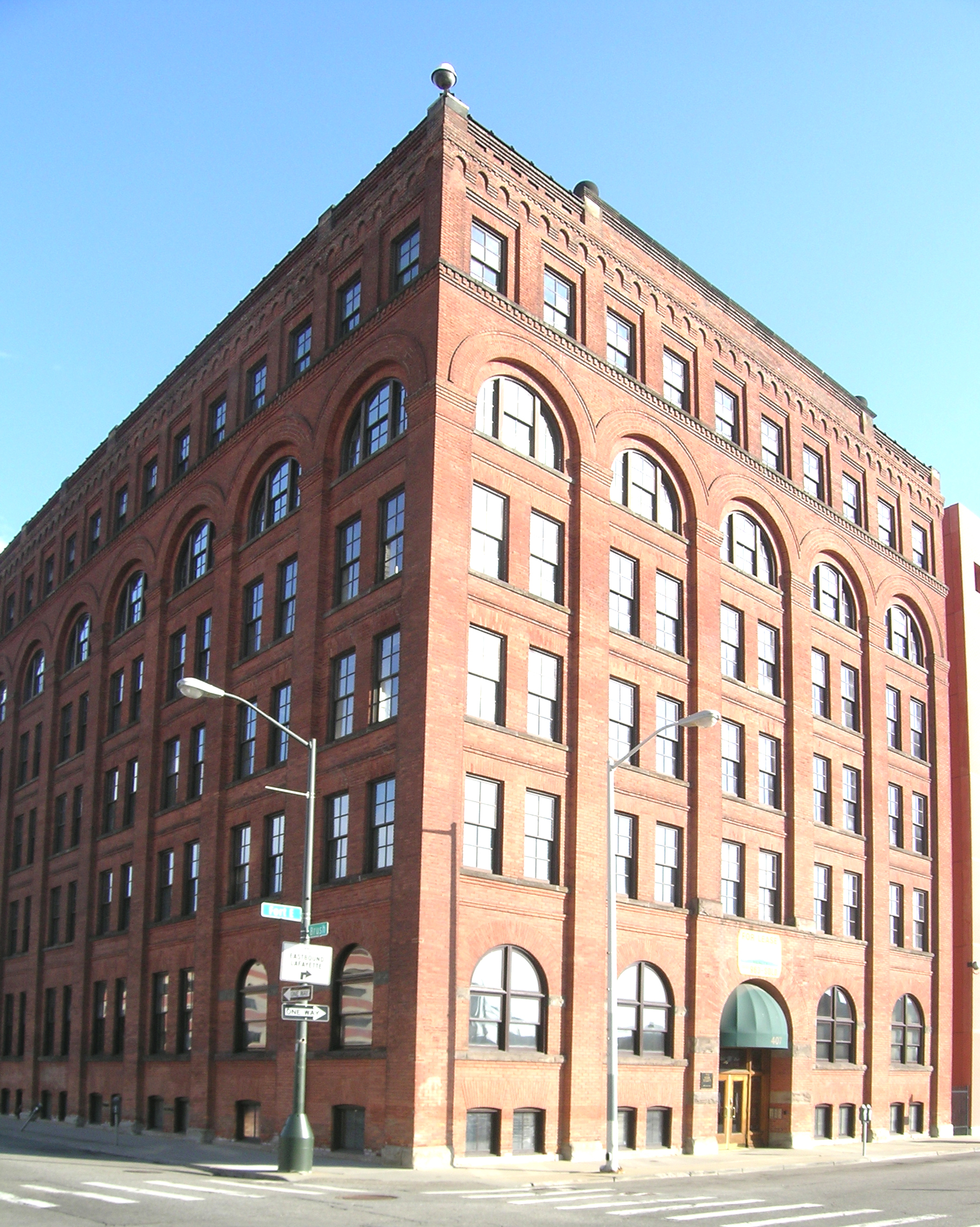
- Interactive map
- Location: 407 E. Fort St., Detroit, Michigan
- Coordinates: 42°19′59″N 83°2′34″W
- Built: 1888
- Architect: William Scott & Company
- Architectural style: Romanesque
- NRHP reference No.: 84000442
- Added to NRHP: November 13, 1984

The Globe Tobacco Building is a manufacturing building located at 407 East Fort Street in Downtown Detroit, Michigan. It is the oldest tobacco manufactory extant in Detroit, and is listed by the National Register of Historic Places.

== History ==
The tobacco industry was a leading component of Detroit's economy during the latter half of the nineteenth century, and by the 1890s was the largest industry in the city. Globe Tobacco, which was one of the largest five manufacturers in the city, was established in 1871 by O. P. Hazard, Thomas McGraw, Hiram Walker, and William Moore. The company was originally located on Atwater Street, and by 1878 manufactured about 300,000 pounds of tobacco annually. The company was incorporated in 1880, and by 1883 production was over 1,300,000 pounds annually.

By 1888, the company had outgrown its facility on Atwater, and decided to construct a new facility. The company hired Alexander Chapoton to build the factory, and construction began in 1888. By 1892, Globe production was up to 2.5 million pounds annually. However, by 1916, the property was transferred to trustees, and by 1925 the Globe Tobacco Company was out of business. Various small manufacturers rented portions of the building from 1916 until well into the 1970s. The building was listed on the National Register of Historic Places in 1984.

At one time the company Real Times Media, owner of black newspapers in the US, had its headquarters in the Globe Tobacco Building. Redstone Architects designed the renovation for the building into office space in 1984. In 2014, Rock Ventures purchased the building and renovated it to house office space for various tech and small businesses.

== Architecture ==
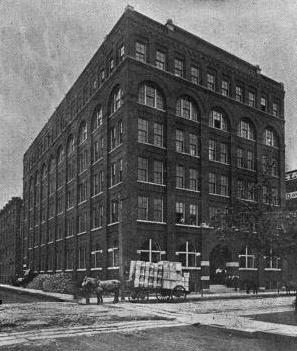
Globe Tobacco Building, c. 1891

Designed by William Scott & Company, Alexander Chapoton built this six-story red brick Romanesque mill-style building with load-bearing masonry walls and heavy timbered roof and floors. The facade is divided into five bays. A 1 1/2-story entrance archway is located in the center bay on the south side, and is flanked by two concrete spheres. Large arched windows are located on the first floor in the other bays. Pilasters run between the first story and the fourth, starting win a limestone block base and ending in forms that continue into round-arched windows on the fifth story. Brick denticulation separates the sixth floor from the lower ones, and the sixth floor is not divided into bays, but rather has evenly spaced rectangular window openings separated by pilasters.

Square brick panelling is stepped out above the sixth floor, providing a bearing surface for the heavy roof timbers and protection from fire. On the interior, heavy timber floor beams are spaced about four feet apart and held up by girders, forming fireproof layers between floors.
