= Willem Usselincx =

17th-century Flemish merchant and diplomat

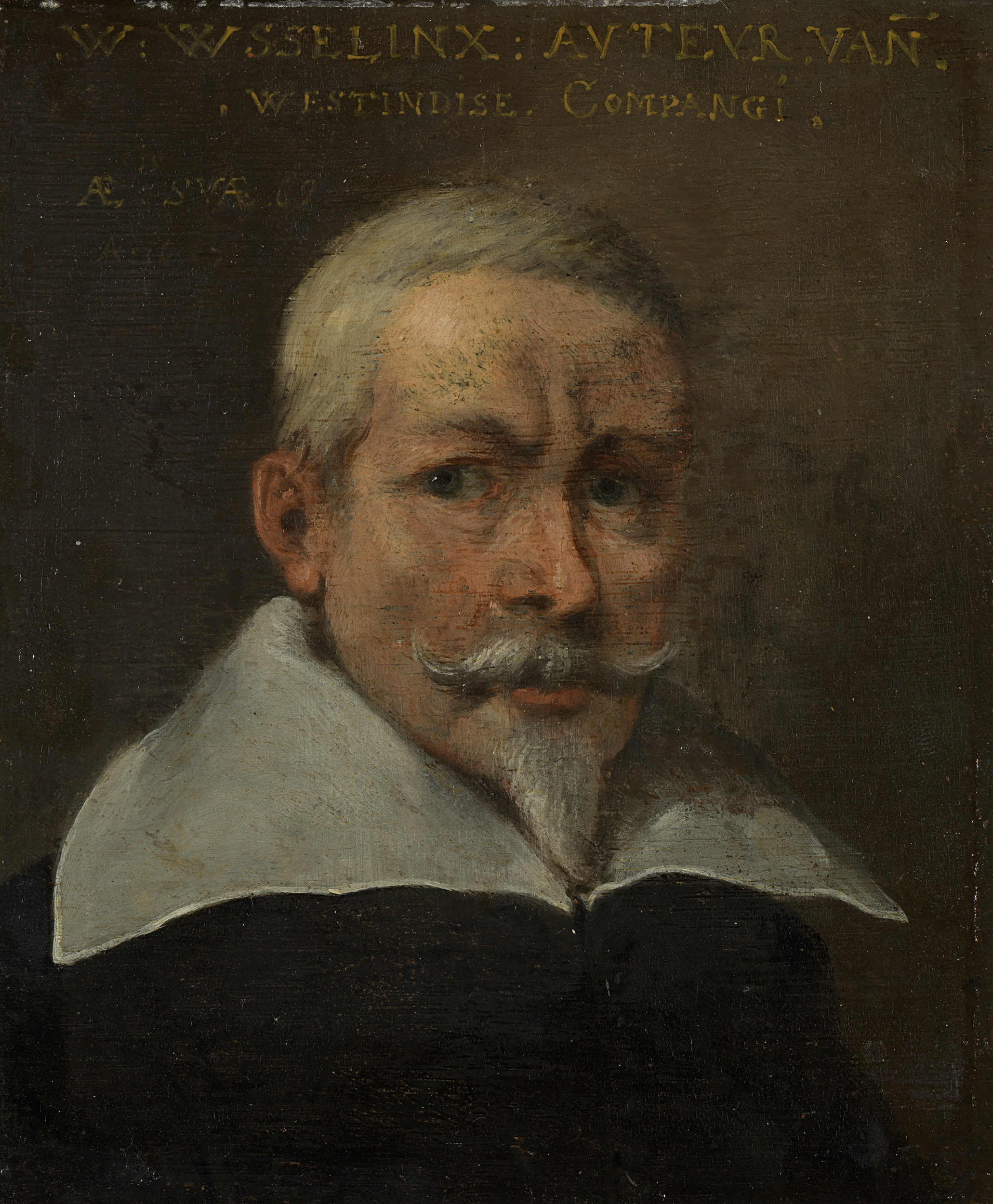
- Willem Usselincx, 1637
- Born: 1567; Antwerp, Spanish Netherlands
- Died: c. 1647 (aged 79–80)
- Occupation(s): Merchant, diplomat
- Known for: Founder of the Dutch West India Company

Willem Usselincx (1567 – c. 1647) was a Flemish Dutch merchant, investor and diplomat who was instrumental in drawing both Dutch and Swedish attention to the importance of the New World. Usselincx was the founding father of the Dutch West India Company.

== Background ==
Usselincx was born in Antwerp (in present-day Flanders, Belgium), during a time of major upheaval and change.

As part of Antwerp's terms of surrender, its Protestant citizens were given four years to settle their affairs before quitting the city. Some returned to Roman Catholicism, but many left the city; of the pre-siege population of 100,000 people, only 40,000 remained. Most settlers went to the Republic of the Seven United Netherlands (the unoccupied part of the Union of Utrecht) in the north, laying the commercial foundation for the subsequent "Dutch Golden Age". Antwerp's banking was controlled for a generation by Genoa, and Amsterdam became the new trading centre of the region—the population of Amsterdam went from 30,000 in 1570 to 60,000 in 1600, and the Amsterdam Canal District was constructed to accommodate the traders and bankers from Antwerp. The Southern Netherlands became known as the Spanish Netherlands.

== Dutch West India Company ==
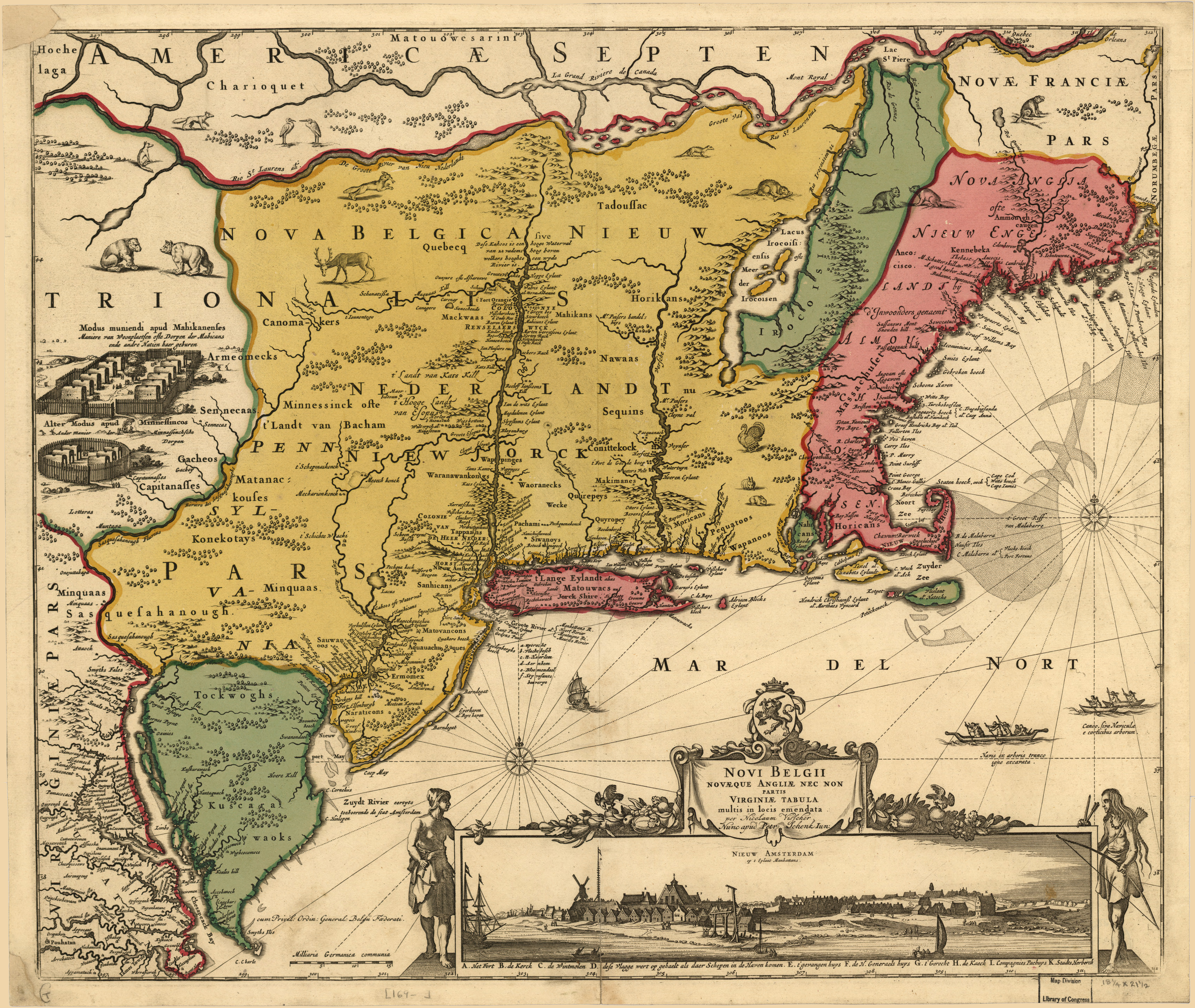
Novi Belgii Novæque Angliæ, Nicolaes Visscher I (1618–1679)

Usselincx had spent some time in Spain, Portugal and on the Azores. There he saw the wealth that was produced by the Spanish and Portuguese colonies. Some time after the seizure of Antwerp by the Spanish in 1585, Usselincx moved to the Republic of the Seven United Netherlands, first to Middelburg and later to Amsterdam. He was convinced that the Netherlands would win independence and should capture colonies from Spain and Portugal.

His treatise Naerder Bedenckingen, Over de zee-vaerdt, Coophandel ende Neeringhe, als mede de versekeringhe vanden Staet was first printed in 1608. This work presented Usselincx's arguments for a West India trading company and made frequent reference to the Spanish power and source of wealth in the West Indies.

In 1621, Usselincx was one of the founding fathers of the Dutch West India Company, an enterprise he had planned for many years. His intentions were not entirely commercial. He hoped to create a new and better society. He expected that thousands of Protestants would migrate to America. He did not wish so much to exploit the country, but rather to let arise a New Netherland. In this secondary goal, he was insufficiently supported by the States-General of the Netherlands.

== Swedish South Company ==
New Netherland (magenta) and New Sweden (blue)

Usselincx relocated from The Netherlands to Sweden but the process of the founding of the new company was difficult and time-consuming, despite the support of Axel Oxenstierna, Swedish Lord High Chancellor. Its charter included Swedish, Dutch, and German stockholders led by directors of the New Sweden Company. Between 1638 and 1655, the company sponsored 11 expeditions to Delaware in 14 separate voyages (two did not survive).

In 1649 the Swedish South Company lost its monopoly on tobacco, granted by the king of Sweden in 1641. In 1655 New Sweden was annexed by New Netherland, this brought an end to the activities of the Swedish South Company, it was dissolved in 1680.

== Other sources ==
- Fiske, John The Dutch and Quaker Colonies in America (New York: Houghton Mifflin, 1902). https://archive.org/details/dutchandquaker01fiskrich/mode/2up
- Jameson, J. Franklin Willem Usselinx: Founder of the Dutch and Swedish West India Companies (G.P. Putnam's Sons. 1887). https://archive.org/details/willemusselinxf00jamegoog/mode/2up
- Mickley, Joseph J. Some Account of William Usselinx and Peter Minuit: Two individuals who were instrumental in establishing the first permanent colony in Delaware (The Historical Society of Delaware. 1881)
- Johnson, Amandus The Swedes on the Delaware, 1638-1664 (Philadelphia, PA: The Swedish Colonial Society. 1915)
