= Gazette van Detroit =

Defunct American newspaper

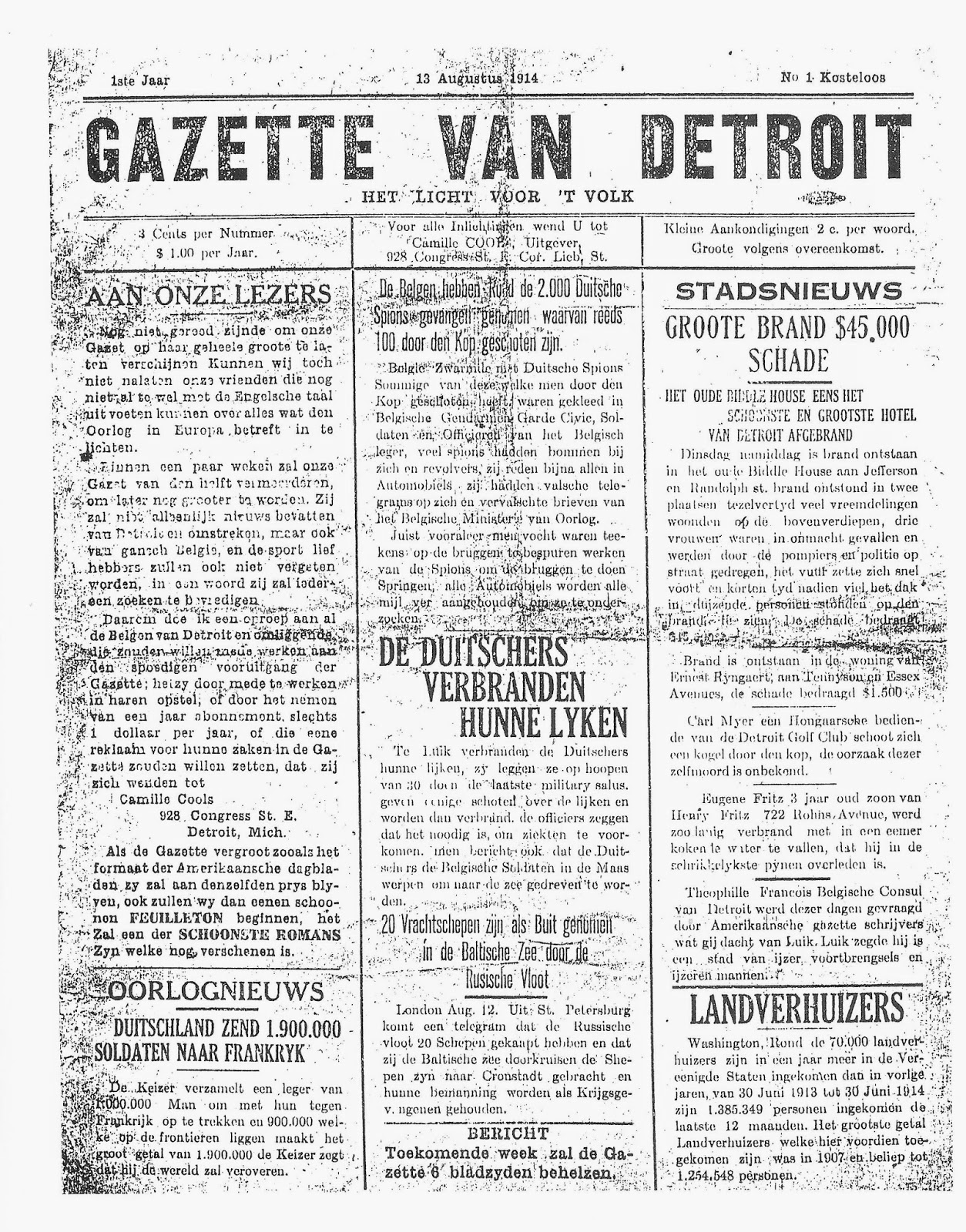
- Cover page of the first edition.
- Type: Biweekly newspaper
- Founded: 1914
- Ceased publication: 2018
- Headquarters: Roseville, Michigan, United States
- Price: USD 1
- Website: www.flemishlibrary.org/home/gazette-van-detroit

The Gazette van Detroit ("Gazette of Detroit") was a Flemish newspaper in Dutch and English that was published in the United States from 13 August 1914 until 2018. It was aimed at Flemish immigrants and their descendants living in the United States and Canada, but latterly also some subscribers in Europe. Its parent company was a 501(c)(3) U.S. Internal Revenue Service recognized non-profit called Belgian Publishing Inc. Its final chairman was David Baeckelandt. The newspaper was published by "Belgian Publishing Inc." at 18740 13 Mile Road in Roseville, Michigan.

The Gazette van Detroit first appeared as a weekly newspaper, later it became bi-weekly, and finally monthly. It had become an online-only paper before its ultimate demise. It was the longest lasting Belgian American newspaper, outlasting the Gazette van Moline at Moline, Illinois (1907–40). The newspaper's original mission statement, published in an article entitled "The Light for the People" (Het Licht voor 't Volk) set forward the newspaper's aim:

"The Gazette van Detroit is an unaffiliated, apolitical, non-profit organization written by and for North Americans of Flemish descent and Dutch-speaking Belgians. Its goal is to serve as a cultural bridge between North America and the Dutch-speaking region of Belgium. Simultaneously, the Gazette seeks cordial relations with all ethnicities and nationalities."

By 2004, celebrating its ninetieth birthday, it was still a popular newspaper among North Americans of Flemish ancestry and their relatives in Belgium. In 2006, the Flemish Government donated 12,500 euro to ensure the Gazette van Detroit could continue its operations. The newspaper finally folded in 2018.

The Gazette van Detroit and its parent, The Belgian Publishing Company, ceased publishing and operation on December 31, 2018. All content and holdings have been transferred to the Genealogical Society of Flemish Americans (GSFA).
