= St. Charles Borromeo Catholic Church (Detroit) =

Historic church in Michigan, United States

- St. Charles Borromeo Roman Catholic Parish Complex
- U.S. National Register of Historic Places
- U.S. Historic district
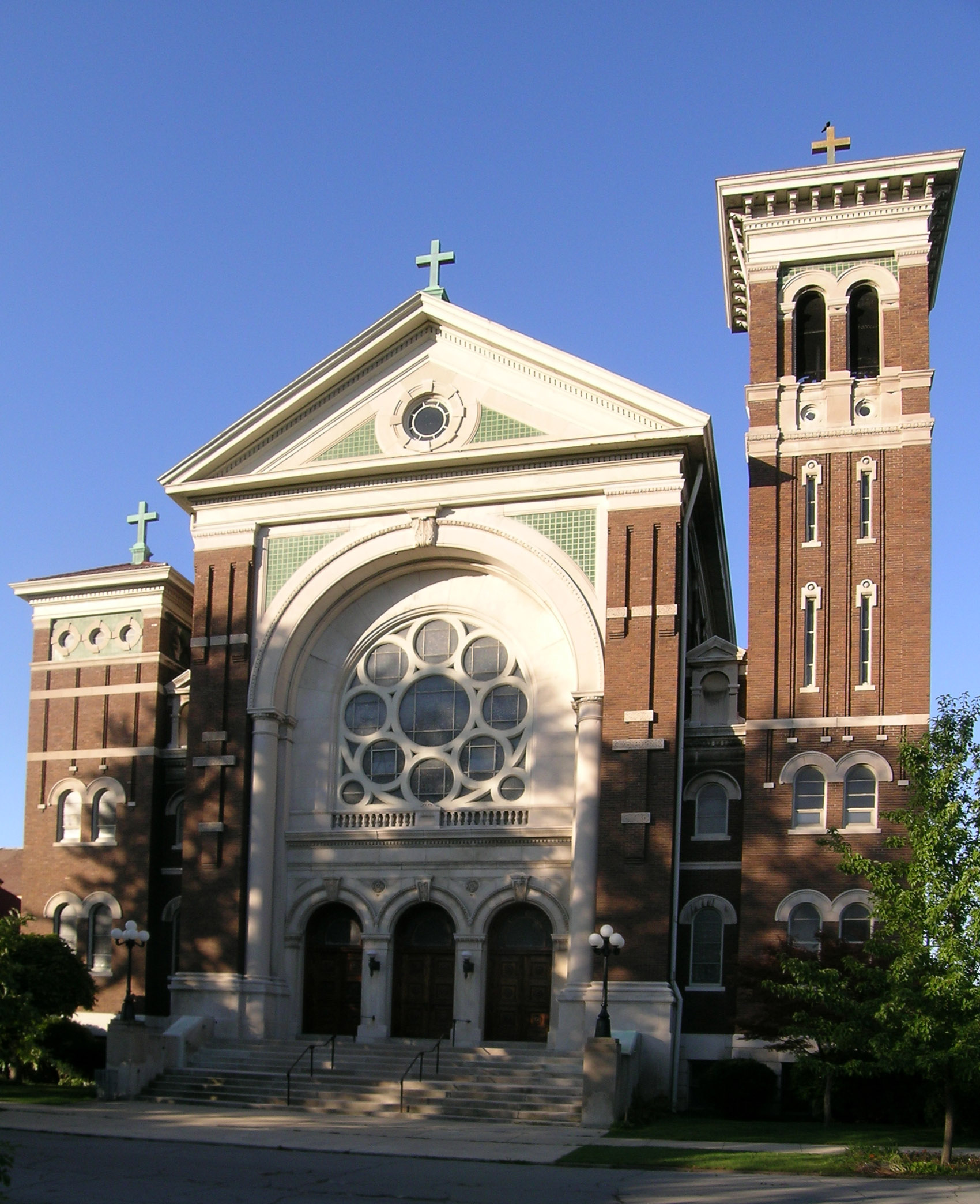
- Interactive map
- Location: 1491-1515 Baldwin Street Detroit, Michigan
- Coordinates: 42°21′18″N 83°0′7″W
- Built: 1912
- Architect: Van Leyen & Schilling; Peter Dederichs
- Architectural style: Late 19th And 20th Century Revivals, Romanesque Revival, Baroque Revival, Prairie School
- NRHP reference No.: 89000488
- Added to NRHP: June 09, 1989

St. Charles Borromeo Catholic Church is a Black Catholic church located at the corner of Baldwin Avenue and St. Paul Avenue in Detroit, Michigan. The church address is 1515 Baldwin Street; The church address is 1515 Baldwin Street; the parish rectory is located at 1491 Baldwin and sits next door to the church. The complex was listed on the National Register of Historic Places in 1989.

== History ==
In the late 1850s, Belgian Catholics immigrated to Detroit and settled in the eastside neighborhoods near Gratiot and Baldwin. In 1886, a parish dedicated to St. Charles Borromeo was established to minister to this congregation. A wood-frame church was constructed for the parish, and quickly expanded. As Detroit grew, the parish grew along with it, with French, German, Irish, Scotch, and English immigrant congregants in addition to the original Belgians. By 1920, the congregation numbered over 3000. By the 1930s, the school's population also included many Catholic children of Syrian and Italian immigrants.

In 1912, the two-story rectory and school was designed and built by Van Leyen & Schilling. In 1918, Peter Dederichs was awarded a contract to build an "edifice of Romanesque style for religious use". Just four years after the church was completed, it was expanded to meet the needs of the growing congregation.

The church is presently an African-American congregation staffed in part by the Josephites. The rectory serves its original function, and the school has been redeveloped as condos.

== Architecture ==
The St. Charles Borromeo parish complex consisted of four buildings, three of which are historically significant: the church itself, the rectory, and the school.

The church is built with red-brown tapestry brick on a white Bedford stone foundation, with trim of the same stone. The church is built in a Latin Cross plan, 92 feet across and 180 feet in depth. The design is Romanesque with Arts and Crafts elements. The front facade is flanked by asymmetric towers with red tiled hip-roofs. The entranceway is within a two-story arched structure with columns on each side, above which is a large rose window. Rosettes are in the spandrels above the entrance arches, and green tile fills the spandrels and pediments of the front and side facades. The decorative brick pilasters around the central arch are derived from Prairie School or Arts and Crafts models.

The main altar is Baroque in style. The organ was built in two sections to clear the rose window above the main entrance.

The school and rectory were designed in the Prairie style with some Byzantine elements.
