= John H. Sengstacke =

American businessman (1912–1997)

- Sengstacke circa 1955
- Born: John Herman Henry Sengstacke; November 25, 1912; Savannah, Georgia, U.S.
- Died: May 28, 1997 (aged 84); Chicago, Illinois, U.S.
- Education: Hampton Institute
- Occupations: Newspaper publisher; Editor
- Years active: 1930–1997
- Known for: Publisher & editor of The Chicago Defender
- Spouse: Myrtle Elizabeth Picou (m. 1939–1997)
- Children: 3, including Robert (Bobby) Abbott Sengstacke
- Relatives: Robert S. Abbott (uncle)

John Herman Henry Sengstacke (November 25, 1912 – May 28, 1997) was an American newspaper publisher and owner of the largest chain of African-American oriented newspapers in the United States. Sengstacke was also a civil rights activist and worked for a strong black press, founding the National Newspaper Publishers Association in 1940, to unify and strengthen African-American owned papers. Sengstacke served seven terms as president of the association, which by the early 21st century had 200 members.

A nephew of newspaper founder, Robert Sengstacke Abbott, Sengstacke was Abbott's designated heir to take over the Chicago Defender, which he did after his uncle's death in 1940. Sengstacke also published the Michigan Chronicle in Detroit; the Tri-State Defender in Memphis, Tennessee; and acquired the Pittsburgh Courier in 1966, re–opening it the next year as the New Pittsburgh Courier. Sengstacke worked with President Franklin D. Roosevelt to have African-American reporters admitted to presidential press conferences. He pressed for opportunities in the United States Postal Service for African Americans. One of Sengstacke's major political goals was to desegregate the armed forces. President Harry Truman supported this goal, naming Sengstacke to the commission he formed in 1948 to integrate the military. Sengstacke died in 1997 at age 84. In 2000, he was posthumously presented with the Presidential Citizens Medal by U.S. President Bill Clinton.

== Biography ==
=== Early life and education ===
John Herman Henry Sengstacke was born in Savannah, Georgia, to Herman Alexander (called Alexander) Sengstacke and his wife Rosa Mae Davis on November 25, 1912. He was named for his paternal grandfather, John H. Sengstacke, a Congregationalist minister, teacher and publisher. The elder Sengstacke was the son of Herman Sengstacke, a German sea captain, and his wife Tama Melrose, a former slave from West Africa whose freedom he purchased in Georgia. She died young after the birth of their daughter. Sengstacke returned to Germany, taking his mixed-race children for relatives to raise while he was on ships. Later, Sengstacke and his son returned to the US.

Several years later, John H. Sengstacke was ordained as a Congregationalist minister. After settling in Woodville, now a neighborhood of Savannah, Georgia, he became a teacher to improve black education, and a publisher of two local newspapers, including the Woodville Times. Sengstacke had married the widow Flora Butler Abbott, a former slave from St. Simon's Island, Georgia. She had a year-old son Robert, whom he treated as his own. Robert Abbott took his stepfather's surname as his middle name. The Sengstackes also had seven children together, including Alexander; they were half-siblings to Robert Abbott.

Beginning in 1905, when Abbott had settled in Chicago after getting a law degree, he founded and published The Chicago Defender. It rapidly achieved high circulation in the early 20th century as the African-American population expanded in Chicago and other northern cities by the Great Migration. It became known as the major Black newspaper of the country, and Abbott became a millionaire by 1918.

When his nephew John H.H. Sengstacke was young, Abbott noticed his interest and work on his father's newspaper, and designated him as Abbott's successor for the Chicago Defender. Young John worked with his father Alexander on the Woodville Times, founded by his namesake grandfather. Abbott groomed Sengstacke to take over the Chicago Defender, paying for his nephew's education at Hampton Institute, his own alma mater and a historically black college. During the summers Sengstacke worked on the Defender, graduating from Hampton in 1934. Abbott also subsidized his nephew's additional studies at the Mergenthaler Linotype School, The Chicago School of Printing, Northwestern University, and Ohio State University. Abbott appointed Sengstacke as vice president and general manager of The Robert S. Abbott Publishing Company in 1936, after he had assisted as an aide.

In 1939 Sengstacke married Myrtle Elizabeth Picou, a Louisiana Creole from New Orleans and Los Angeles. They had three children, John Herman Henry Sengstacke III; Lewis Willis Sengstacke, named for Myrtle's side; and Robert Abbott Sengstacke, named in honor of his uncle. Myrtle was an activist in her own right, working at political fundraising, as well as cultural and art activities.

=== Career ===
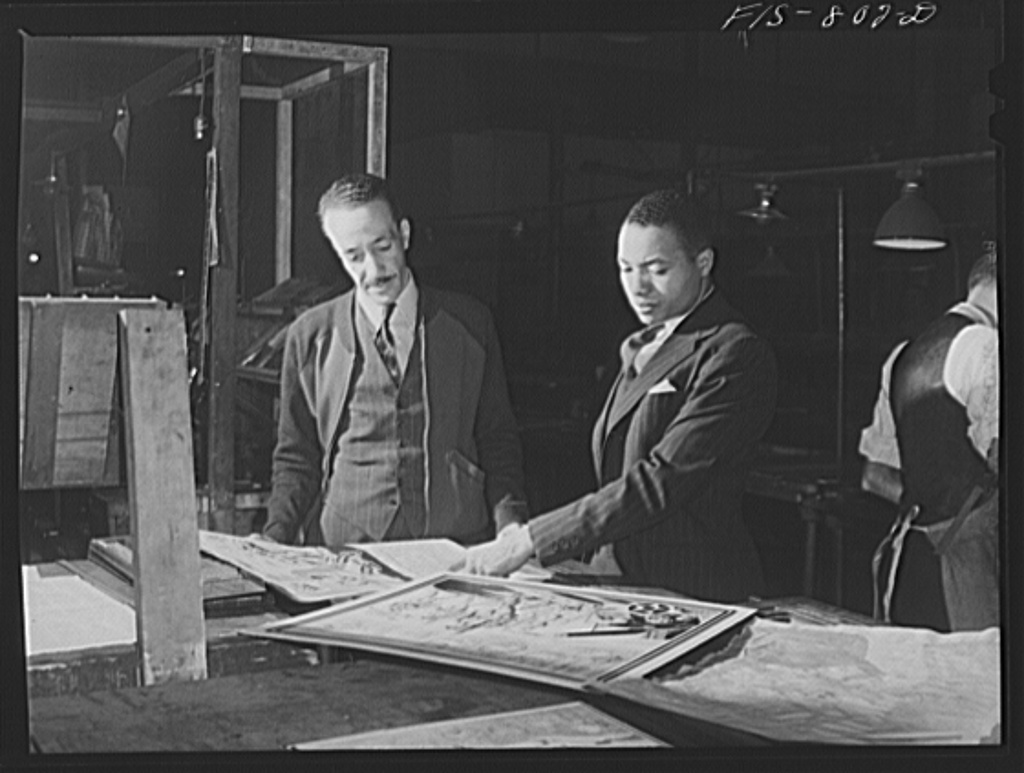
John H. Sengstacke (right), 1942.

In 1940, Sengstacke founded the National Newspaper Publishers Association, to bring together African-American publishers of newspapers. He served as president of the association for seven term, seeking to bring publishers together to increase their voice in the industry. It has grown to have 200 members in the 21st century. In 1940, Abbott died and John Sengstacke inherited his uncle's newspaper, becoming president of the company. His role was challenged by Edna Abbott, his uncle's widow, and he had to continue a suit for 10 years before gaining control of the newspaper company. Through that period, the Defender never missed an issue.

During the years of World War II, Sengstacke acted as a national spokesmen for African-American journalism and publishers. He worked with President Franklin D. Roosevelt to ensure that African-American reporters were admitted to presidential press conferences. He also worked to persuade the president to expand opportunities for blacks in the federal government. Considerable discrimination had taken place due to the political power of the Solid South; its white conservative Democrats had strong influence in Congress due to having disenfranchised African Americans in the South.

In 1947, Sengstacke helped co-found Americans for Democratic Action with: Joseph Alsop, Stewart Alsop, Chester Bowles, John Kenneth Galbraith, Leon Henderson, Hubert Humphrey James I. Loeb, Reinhold Niebuhr, Joseph P. Lash, Joseph L. Rauh, Jr., Walter Reuther, Eleanor Roosevelt, Arthur Schlesinger, Jr., and Wilson W. Wyatt.

One of Sengstacke's major goals at the national level was to desegregate the armed forces, particularly given the sacrifices of African Americans in the Armed Forces during World War II. President Harry Truman named Sengstacke to the commission he formed in 1948 to integrate the military, which started in 1949.

The Great Migration had continued during and after the war years until 1970, with a total of 6.5 million African Americans leaving the South, some 5 million from 1940 to 1970. The second wave of migration was chiefly to California and other West Coast cities, as people were attracted by jobs in the defense industry. In the postwar period, veterans and other African Americans pressed for civil rights in the South, where most black citizens had been disenfranchised since the turn of the century, kept in second-class status under Jim Crow, confined to segregated spaces. In 1956, Sengstacke turned the weekly Chicago Defender into a daily, to keep up with changing conditions and report on black progress. At that time, The Chicago Defender was still the nation's largest African American-owned daily paper. Sengstacke also owned the Michigan Chronicle in Detroit, Michigan, where many blacks worked in the auto industry, and the Tri-State Defender in Memphis, Tennessee, another center of African-American population and businesses. In the late 1960s Sengstacke purchased the financially ailing black newspaper, the Pittsburgh Courier, which had achieved a national reputation during the 1930s and 1940s. It is considered to have been the most influential black newspaper in the country. He re-opened it as the New Pittsburgh Courier in 1967. He continued to be a leader in building black journalism. In 1974 Sengstacke appointed Hazel B. Garland as the new editor-in-chief of the New Pittsburgh Courier; she was the former city editor and the first African-American woman to be managing editor of a national newspaper.

When asked about his decision, Sengstacke replied:

I have supreme confidence in Hazel, and believe that she will continue to do a great job as editor-in-chief as she did as city editor. She has proven herself over the many years of dedication to the Courier and the Negro cause. She will be a guiding force in leading this paper to bigger and better things in the future.

Two years later, the paper won the John B. Russwurm Award for the best national African-American newspaper.

=== Death and legacy ===
John Sengstacke died on May 28, 1997. His chain of newspapers was run under a family trust until 2003. It was sold to Real Times, whose investors included people with family and business ties to him. Among the new owners was Sengstacke's nephew Thomas Sengstacke Picou. In 2002, he said his plans for the New Pittsburgh Courier included more emphasis on in-depth features and arts, creating a web presence — which neither it nor the Defender had at the time — and changing its political outlook from liberal to "conservative independence".

== Honors ==
- 1976, the New Pittsburgh Courier won the John B. Russwurm Award for the best national African-American newspaper.
- A 28-minute documentary, John Sengstacke, The Chicago Defender (1986), was produced and directed by Chuck Sterin.
- Sengstacke was featured in an on-camera interview in the documentary film, The Black Press: Soldiers without Swords (1999), produced and directed by Stanley Nelson and first aired on PBS on February 8, 1999.
- On January 8, 2001, Sengstacke was awarded posthumously with the Presidential Citizens Medal by President Bill Clinton.
- Thomas Sengstacke Picou, nephew of John, headed a group of business people including Sengstacke's only son Robert A. Sengstacke. They purchased Sengstacke's chain of four newspapers in 2012, at the time the largest black-owned chain of African-American newspapers in the country.
- Robert A. Sengstacke, his surviving son, donated the Abbott-Sengstacke Family Papers to the Chicago Public Library, where they are available for scholars.
