= New Pittsburgh Courier =

Newspaper in Pittsburgh, Pennsylvania, US

- Type: Weekly newspaper
- Owner: Real Times
- Publisher: Rod Doss
- Editor: Rod Doss
- Founded: 1966; 60 years ago
- Headquarters: 315 East Carson Street, Pittsburgh, Pennsylvania, United States
- Circulation: 3,480 (as of 2012)
- ISSN: 1047-8051
- Website: newpittsburghcourier.com

The New Pittsburgh Courier is a weekly African-American newspaper based in Pittsburgh, Pennsylvania, United States. It is owned by Real Times.

== History ==
The newspaper is named after the original Pittsburgh Courier (1907–1966), which in the 1930s and 1940s was one of the largest and most influential African-American newspapers in the country, with a nationwide circulation of more than 350,000.

After circulation declines in the 1950s and 1960s, the original Courier was purchased by John H. Sengstacke, publisher of The Chicago Daily Defender, in 1965. He reorganized the paper under a new name—the New Pittsburgh Courier—to avoid paying several outstanding tax bills and invoices. He later commented:

"The Courier had a great history. The loss would not only be a big loss for the city of Pittsburgh, but a devastating loss for the entire country. The Black press is the only true voice Black people have. I've worked tireless to make sure that it is heard loud and clear throughout this country.

— John H. Sengstacke

He re-opened it in 1967 under the new name. The New Pittsburgh Courier joined Sengstacke's three other newspapers in a chain of prominent African-American publications, including the Defender. In 1974, Sengstacke appointed Hazel B. Garland as the new editor-in-chief of the New Pittsburgh Courier, making her the first African-American woman in history to be editor of a national newspaper. When asked about his decision, Sengstacke replied: "I have supreme confidence in Hazel, and believe that she will continue to do a great job as editor-in-chief as she did as city editor. She has proven herself over the many years of dedication to the Courier and the Negro cause. She will be a guiding force in leading this paper to bigger and better things in the future." Two years later, the paper won the John B. Russwurm Award for the best national African-American newspaper.

Following Sengstacke's death in 1997, what was then a four-paper chain was held in a family trust until 2003. It was sold that year for nearly $12 million to Real Times, a group of investors with several business and family ties to Sengstacke.

Among the new owners was Sengstacke's nephew Thomas Sengstacke Picou, who said in 2002 that his plans for the New Pittsburgh Courier include more emphasis on in-depth features and arts, creating a web presence—which neither it nor the Defender had at the time—and a change in its political outlook from liberal to "conservative independence".
