= Billiken (disambiguation) =

The billiken is a charm doll invented in 1908.

Billiken may also refer to:

- Billiken (magazine), Argentine children's magazine started in 1919
- Bud Billiken (1909-1965), pen name of American author Willard Motley
- Bud Billiken Club, social club for African-Americans in Chicago Illinois
- Bud Billiken Parade and Picnic, African-American parade held since 1929
- Saint Louis Billikens, collegiate athletic teams that represent Saint Louis University
- Billiken Sports Center, sports venue in St. Louis, Missouri
- Billiken Angels Network, organization of angel investors in St. Louis, Missouri
