= Knock on Any Door =

1949 film by Nicholas Ray

- Theatrical release poster
- Directed by: Nicholas Ray
- Screenplay by: John Monks Jr. Daniel Taradash
- Based on: Knock on Any Door (1947 novel) by Willard Motley
- Produced by: Robert Lord
- Starring: Humphrey Bogart; John Derek; George Macready; Allene Roberts; Susan Perry
- Cinematography: Burnett Guffey
- Edited by: Viola Lawrence
- Music by: George Antheil
- Production company: Santana Productions
- Distributed by: Columbia Pictures
- Release dates: February 22, 1949 (New York City); March 17, 1949 (United States)
- Running time: 100 minutes
- Country: United States
- Language: English
- Box office: $2.1 million

Knock on Any Door is a 1949 American courtroom trial film noir directed by Nicholas Ray and starring Humphrey Bogart. The movie was based on the 1947 novel of the same name by Willard Motley. The picture gave actor John Derek his breakthrough role as young hoodlum Nick Romano, whose motto was "Live fast, die young, and have a good-looking corpse."

== Plot ==
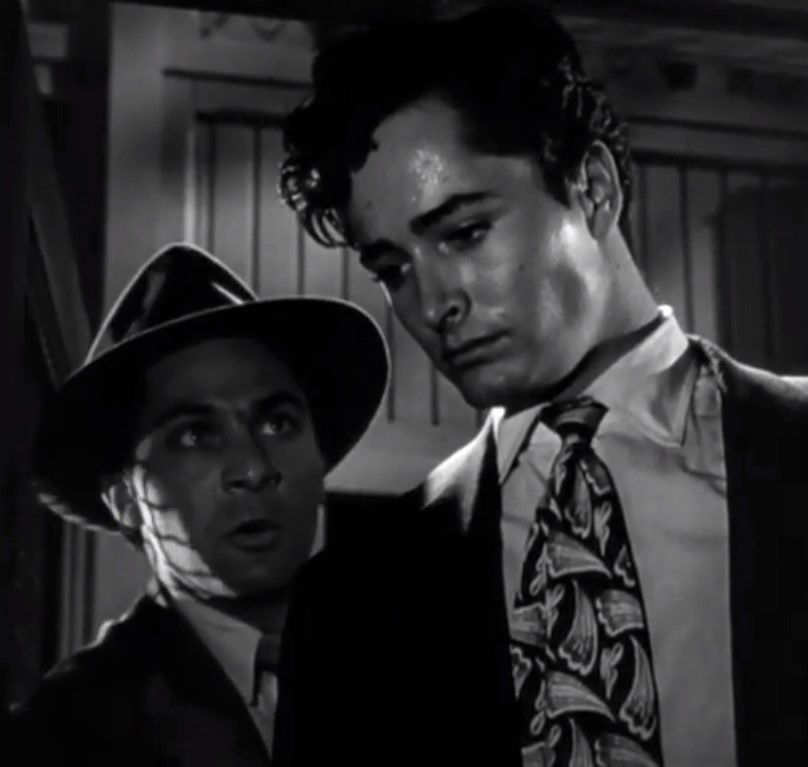
Mickey Knox and John Derek in Knock on Any Door

Against the wishes of his law partners, slick talking lawyer Andrew Morton takes the case of Nick Romano, a troubled punk from the slums, partly because he himself came from the same slums and partly because he feels guilty for his partner botching the criminal trial of Nick's father years earlier. Nick is on trial for shooting a policeman point-blank and faces execution if convicted.

Nick's history is presented through flashbacks showing him as a hoodlum committing one petty crime after another. Morton's wife Adele convinces him to play nursemaid to Nick to make Nick a better person. Nick then robs Morton of $100 after a fishing trip. Shortly after that, Nick marries Emma, and he tries to change his lifestyle. He takes on job after job but keeps getting fired because of his recalcitrance. He wastes his paycheck playing dice, wanting to buy Emma some jewelry, and then walks out on another job after punching his boss. Feeling a lack of hope of ever being able to live a normal life, Nick decides to return to his old ways, sticking to his motto: "Live fast, die young, and leave a good-looking corpse." He abandons Emma, even after she tells him that she is pregnant. After Nick commits a botched hold-up at a train station, he returns to Emma to take her with him as he flees. He finds that she had committed suicide by gas from an open oven door.

Morton's strategy in the courtroom is to argue that slums breed criminals and that society is to blame for crimes committed by people who live in such miserable conditions. Morton argues that Romano is a victim of society and not a natural-born killer. However, his strategy does not have the desired effect on the jury, thanks to the badgering of the seasoned and experienced District Attorney Kerman, who delivers question after question until Nick shouts out his admission of guilt. Morton, who is naïve enough to believe in his client's innocence, is shocked by Nick's confession. Nick decides to change his plea to guilty. During the sentencing hearing, Morton manages to arouse some sympathy for the plight of those in a dead-end existence. He pleads that anyone who "knocks on any door" may find a Nick Romano. Nevertheless, Nick is sentenced to die in the electric chair. Morton visits Nick prior to the execution and watches him walk down the hall to the death chamber.

== Cast ==
- Humphrey Bogart as Andrew Morton
- John Derek as Nick Romano
- George Macready as Dist. Atty. Kerman
- Allene Roberts as Emma Romano
- Candy Toxton as Adele Morton (credited as Susan Perry)
- Mickey Knox as Vito
- Barry Kelley as Judge Drake
- Davis Roberts as Jim "Sunshine" Jackson

== Production ==
Knock on Any Door, based on Willard Motley's 1947 novel of the same name, was Hollywood's second major-studio movie adapted from a novel by an African-American author. (The first was The Foxes of Harrow (1947), adapted from a novel of the same name by Frank Yerby.)

Producer Mark Hellinger purchased the rights to Motley's novel, and intended Humphrey Bogart and Marlon Brando to star in the production. However, after Hellinger died in late 1947, Robert Lord and Bogart formed a corporation to produce the film: Santana Productions, named after Bogart's sailing yacht. Jack L. Warner was reportedly furious at this, fearing that other stars would do the same and major studios would lose their power.

In 1958, Motley wrote a sequel novel, Let No Man Write My Epitaph. This book was also filmed, as Let No Man Write My Epitaph (1960), produced and directed by Philip Leacock and starring Burl Ives, Shelley Winters, James Darren, and Ella Fitzgerald, among others.

== Reception ==
=== Critical response ===
New York Times film critic Bosley Crowther called the film "a pretentious social melodrama" and blasted the film's message and screenplay. He wrote: "Rubbish! The only shortcoming of society which this film proves is that it casually tolerates the pouring of such fraudulence onto the public mind. Not only are the justifications for the boy's delinquencies inept and superficial, as they are tossed off in the script, but the nature and aspect of the hoodlum are outrageously heroized."

The staff at Variety magazine was more receptive of the film, writing: "An eloquent document on juvenile delinquency, its cause and effect, has been fashioned from Knock on Any Door...Nicholas Ray's direction stresses the realism of the script taken from Willard Motley's novel of the same title, and gives the film a hard, taut pace that compels complete attention."

Filmink wrote in 2024 it "isn’t the classic its makers were hoping for, but it’s not a bad film and Derek is effective enough."
