= Christine Howell =

Christine Howell may refer to:

- Christine Warden (born 1950), née Ηοwell, English 400 metres hurdler
- Christine Moore Howell (1899–1972), hair care product businesswoman
