= Jay Jackson (artist) =

American cartoonist (1905-1954)

- Born: September 10, 1905 Oberlin, Ohio, U.S.
- Died: May 16, 1954 (aged 48) Los Angeles
- Area: Cartoonist
- Notable works: Editorial cartoons for The Chicago Defender; Illustrations for Amazing Stories and Fantastic Adventures
- Awards: American Newspaper Guild Front Page award (x2)
- Spouse: Eleanor Poston

Jay Paul Jackson (September 10, 1905 – May 16, 1954) was an African-American artist who spent many years working for the Chicago Defender, in addition to working as an illustrator for science fiction magazines such as Amazing Stories and Fantastic Adventures.

== Background ==
Born in Oberlin, Ohio, Jackson dropped out of school at thirteen. He drove spikes for a railroad, moved to Pittsburgh and worked in a steel mill, attended Ohio Wesleyan University for a year, and had an unsuccessful and brief career as a boxer. He left Wesleyan, started a sign-painting business, and became a featured artist for the Pittsburgh Courier. He began selling illustrations to the Defender and Abbott’s Monthly in the mid-1920s, but did not become a Defender staffer until 1933.

== Defender and elsewhere ==
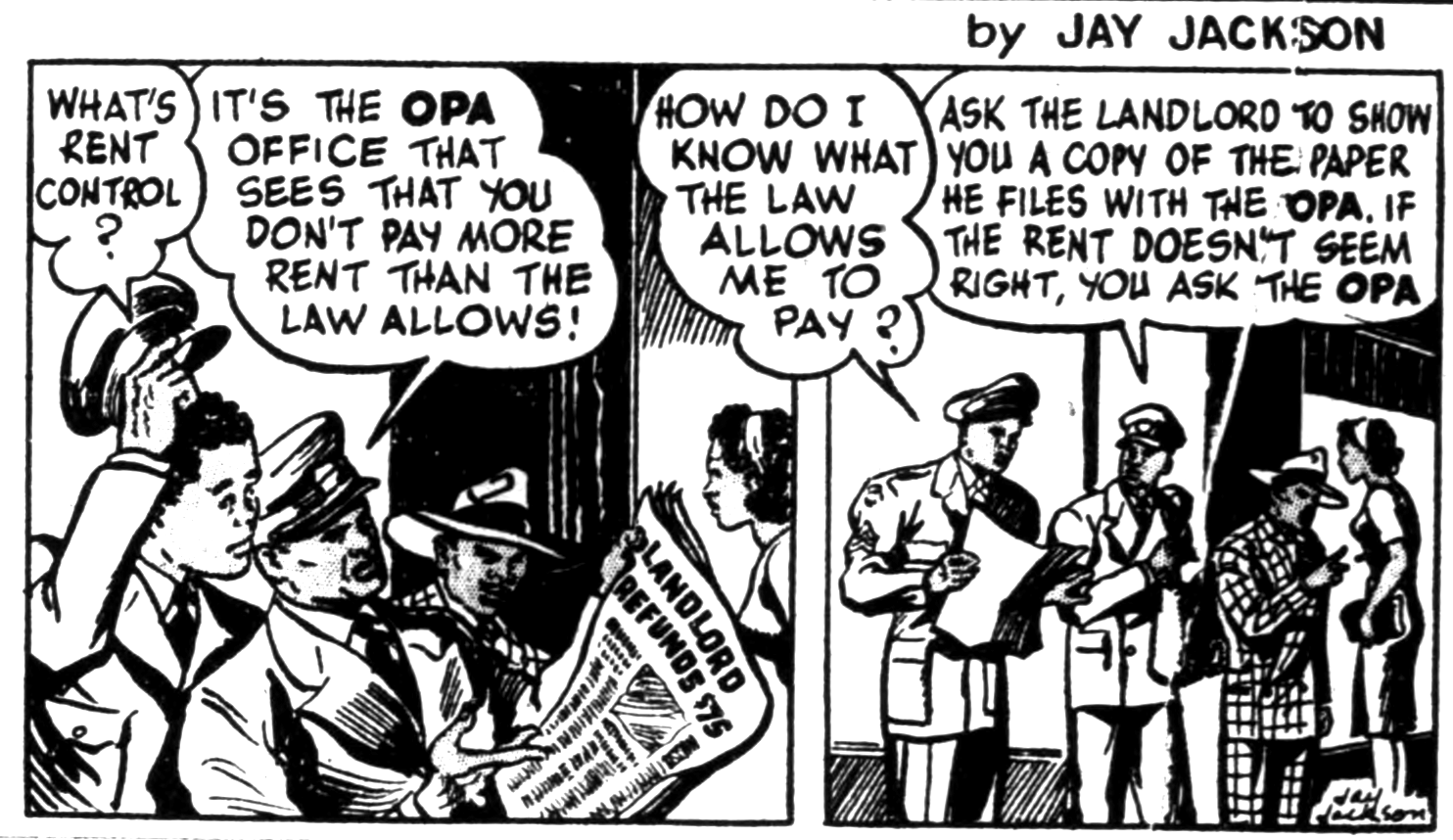
A portion of the Jay Jackson public service comic strip "The Sergeant Looks for a Room" (1945)

By 1934, Jackson was put in charge of cartoons for the Defender. In addition to editorial cartoons, he did a variety of single-panel cartoon series and comic strips for the Defender and other papers of the Negro press, including The Adventures of Bill, As Others See Us, Billy Ken, Exposition Follies, Senda, Skin Deep, Society Sue, Speed Jackson, and Tisha Mingo. In 1934 he revived and reshaped the Defender's long-running Bungleton Green strip. Comics historian Tim Jackson wrote, "Jackson produced an astounding amount of comics and illustrations during the decade of the 1940s... Jackson's illustrations fairly dominated the newspapers in which they appeared." He married Eleanor Poston, a fellow Defender staffer.

Jackson received two "Front Page" awards from the American Newspaper Guild, one for his skewering of HUAC’s attack on Hollywood, because Jackson was known for his biting satire of racists and red-baiters.

== Science fiction ==
In 1938, pioneering science fiction magazine Amazing Stories had fallen on hard times, and had been purchased by Chicago-based cartoonist-turned-ad man William B. Ziff. He turned its editorial direction over to Chicago science fiction fan Ray Palmer. Ziff's company had obtained a dominant position in advertising for black-oriented publications, and he was familiar with Jackson's work for the Defender and other papers. Jackson illustrated three stories in the first Palmer-edited issue of Amazing (June 1938). Over the next four years, his work would appear in nearly forty issues of Amazing and its stablemate, Fantastic Adventures, with Jackson frequently illustrating more than one story in a single issue.

Jackson is believed to be the first black artist used regularly in science fiction magazines. While not genre-savvy, he became more familiar with the field, and was recognized as an especially suitable artist for the kind of humorous science fiction content that Palmer liked to run. He was profiled in Amazing's "Introducing the Author" feature, a rarity for an artist, with a photo which guaranteed that the magazine's readers understood that Jackson was black, a college man with a suburban family and considerable experience in his profession.

After four years in the science fiction field, Jackson realized the potential for science fiction to safely criticize contemporary America by displacing action to another world or time. He stopped his work for the science fiction magazines, but turned the Defender's long-running Bungleton Green strip into science fiction and Green himself into a superhero. "Bung" is killed, revived and rebuilt, time travels first to 1778 (to showcase the shameful history of American slavery), then to Memphis in 2043, where blacks and whites have built a colorblind utopia, but a newly-risen continent of green people treats whites ("chalkies") in a manner painfully familiar to Jackson's black readers of the 1940s. (By 1947, this transformation would be reversed — "it was all a dream" — and another artist would take over the strip, returning it to its gag strip origins which Jackson disdained.)

== After Chicago ==
In 1949, Jackson left Chicago for Los Angeles and set up a studio there. He would stay there, except for a brief period doing murals in Mexico, for the rest of his life.

Jackson worked in a variety of ways: he had a two-page montage in Who’s Who in Colored America, and did illustrations for Who’s Who in the United Nations. He was an illustrator for one of the Telecomics companies (there were two using the same name), some of the earliest cartoon shows on television, essentially a representation of comic strips on screen, with a narrator and voice actors talking over still frames, with only occasional moments of limited animation. He did glamour girl postcards for postcard publisher Colourpicture of Boston. He created two comics he hoped to sell to syndicators, Girligags (a single-panel series featuring pretty girls and gags), and Home Folks, a more realistic slice-of-life humorous series about the ordinary African-American life; but neither found a market.

Jackson died of a heart attack on May 16, 1954. His widow got the Defender to publish the two unpublished strips, and sold them to other major black newspapers, including the Michigan Chronicle, Louisville Defender, Tri-State Defender and the New York Age Defender.

== Works ==
- Bungleton Green and the mystic commandos, introduction by Jeet Heer; New York : New York Review Books, 2022, ISBN 978-1-68137-665-3
