= Key West (film) =

1973 television film by Philip Leacock

- Genre: Drama; Thriller
- Written by: Denne Bart Petitclerc (as Anthony S. Martin)
- Directed by: Philip Leacock
- Starring: Stephen Boyd
- Music by: Frank De Vol
- Country of origin: United States
- Original language: English

Production
- Executive producer: Donald R. Daves
- Producers: Denne Bart Petitclerc; Robert E. Relyea (as Robert Relyea)
- Cinematography: Ben Colman; Ted Voigtlander
- Editor: Bill Brame
- Running time: 100 minutes
- Production company: Warner Bros. Television

Original release
- Network: NBC
- Release: December 10, 1973

Key West is a 1973 American made-for-television drama thriller film directed by Philip Leacock and starring Stephen Boyd. It was the pilot for a TV series that did not eventuate but it still screened as a stand-alone movie.

== Plot ==
Two friends operate a charter boat business in Key West.

== Cast ==
- Stephen Boyd as Steve Cutler
- Woody Strode as Candy Rhodes
- Tiffany Bolling as Ruth Frazier
- Simon Oakland as General Tom Luker
- William Prince as Senator Scott
- Ford Rainey as Prescott Webb
- Don Collier as Chief Jim Miller
- Shug Fisher as Sam Olsen (as George 'Shug' Fisher)
- Sheree North as Brandi
- Earl Hindman as Rick
- Stephen Mendillo as George Lucey
- Virginia Kiser as Carol Luker
- Tony Giorgio as Joseph Canto
- Milton Selzer as Stauffer
- Dick Sabol as Bodie
- Courtney Brown as Ryder
- Buddy Owen as Elmo Gant
- Earl Widener as Albert

== See also ==
- List of American films of 1973
