= Let No Man Write My Epitaph =

1960 film by Philip Leacock

- Directed by: Philip Leacock
- Screenplay by: Robert Presnell, Jr.
- Based on: Let No Man Write My Epitaph; 1958 novel by Willard Motley
- Produced by: Boris D. Kaplan
- Starring: Burl Ives; Shelley Winters; James Darren; Jean Seberg; Ricardo Montalbán; Ella Fitzgerald
- Cinematography: Burnett Guffey
- Edited by: Chester W. Schaeffer
- Music by: George Duning
- Color process: Black and white
- Production company: Boris D. Kaplan Productions
- Distributed by: Columbia Pictures
- Release date: October 1960
- Running time: 106 minutes
- Country: United States
- Language: English

Let No Man Write My Epitaph is a 1960 American social problem crime film directed by Philip Leacock and starring Burl Ives, Shelley Winters, James Darren, Jean Seberg, Ricardo Montalbán and Ella Fitzgerald. The screenplay was by Robert Presnell Jr. based on the 1958 novel of the same title by Willard Motley. It is a sequel to the 1949 film Knock on Any Door, also based on a Motley novel.

The story concerns the son of an executed criminal who aspires to escape his impoverished, crime-ridden neighborhood with the help of his mother and a group of concerned neighbors.

== Plot ==
In 1950, Nick Romano Jr., whose father was a convicted murderer and died in the electric chair (the story told in Knock on Any Door), lives in a Chicago tenement building with his mother Nellie Romano. Nellie supports herself and Nick by working as a barmaid, saving money in the hope that Nick will one day attend college and be a success in life. As a young boy, Nick befriends several of the neighborhood residents, including the alcoholic former Judge Bruce Mallory Sullivan, disabled newspaper vendor Wart, former prizefighter Goodbye George, lounge singer Flora, deliveryman/ taxi driver Max, and prostitute Fran. When Nellie is unfairly fired just before Christmas, the Romanos' friends all surprise her with Christmas decorations, food and gifts, and join in an impromptu party. Feeling a family connection to each other and young Nick, the group all agree to help Nellie look after the boy and protect him from falling into the life of crime prevalent in the neighborhood.

Ten years later, Nick is about to graduate high school. Through diligent practice, he has become a talented classical pianist who aspires to attend the local conservatory of music, but has been unsuccessful in getting an audition. Nellie is now supporting them both by working as a B-girl and (it is implied) prostitute, causing Nick to suffer abuse from his classmates. Despite promising Nellie that he will not fight and risk injuring his hands, Nick fights several gang members who insulted her, and is saved from serious injury only when George, who has just been released from jail that day, joins the fight to help him. As a result, George is sent back to prison and Nick gets a jail sentence despite Judge Sullivan's drunken attempt to defend him in court. Nick is released when Nellie's new friend Louis Ramponi pays his fine.

Nellie has an affair with Ramponi even though she learns he is married and operating an illegal numbers racket. Judge Sullivan, who himself loves Nellie, learns via Fran and Flora, who has become a heroin addict, that Ramponi is also selling heroin. Ramponi soon gets Nellie secretly addicted to heroin. Nick walks in on them and hears Ramponi berate Nellie for not actually being married to Nick Sr.

Sullivan decides he must do more to help Nick, and takes him to see Grant Holloway, a respectable lawyer and old friend of Sullivan. Coincidentally, Holloway was also the public defender who unsuccessfully represented Nick's father, and now feels he owes a debt to Nick. After hearing the young man play the piano, Holloway agrees to help him get an audition for the conservatory. Nick begins dating Holloway's daughter, Barbara, and the two quickly fall in love. Nick is embarrassed when the Holloways visit him at home and see Nellie in what Nick thinks is a drunken state, but is actually heroin withdrawal.

On the day of Nick's conservatory audition, he learns that Nellie has become a heroin addict due to Ramponi. With a gun taken from Wart, Nick goes after the man, but Ramponi disarms him and holds him captive, planning to dose him with heroin. Alerted by Wart and Flora, Judge Sullivan, Max and Nellie go to Ramponi's business and rescue Nick. Ramponi shoots Sullivan, who in turn kills him by breaking his neck. Sullivan tells Nick to run away before the police arrive, and dies in Nellie's arms. Nellie and her friends mourn Sullivan's death and she declares she will "take the cure" and beat her addiction; the others, recognizing what a struggle life is for all them, are supportive but skeptical. Nick is happily reunited with Barbara and moves on to a better life.

== Cast ==
- Burl Ives as Judge Bruce Mallory Sullivan
- Shelley Winters as Nellie Romano
- James Darren as Nick Romano
- Jean Seberg as Barbara Holloway
- Ricardo Montalbán as Louie Ramponi
- Ella Fitzgerald as Flora
- Rodolfo Acosta as Max (as Rudolph Acosta)
- Philip Ober as Grant Holloway
- Jeanne Cooper as Fran
- Bernie Hamilton as Goodbye George
- Walter Burke as Wart
- Francis De Sales as night court magistrate (as Francis DeSales)
- Michael Davis as Nick Romano (child)

== Production ==
Film rights to the novel were bought by Columbia Pictures. A script was developed under the supervision of Charles Schnee who had an independent deal with Columbia since 1957. Schnee left Columbia in 1959.

== Music ==
Ella Fitzgerald, in her role as Flora, performs several songs in the film, including "I Can't Give You Anything But Love, Baby", "Angel Eyes", and "Reach For Tomorrow". In connection with the film's release, Fitzgerald released the album Ella Fitzgerald Sings Songs from "Let No Man Write My Epitaph" containing the songs from the film along with other selections.

== Reception ==
The Monthly Film Bulletin wrote: "Though there are one or two scenes of strong-arm sadism that carry a vicarious thrill – the hero's fist fights with leather-jacketed youths in defence of his mother's reputation, his binding and gagging in readiness for a forcible injection of dope – this antiquated study in Skid Row squalor has to rely on its acting to rescue it from total drabness. Burl Ives as the Judge, Shelley Winters as the mother, Jeanne Cooper as the prostitute and James Darren as the unlikely Rubinstein of the slums, all survive in spite of the extreme banality of the material. Philip Leacock's direction is as ponderous as the subject."

Variety wrote: "Let No Man Write My Epitaph is powerful drama but the general subject, backgrounded against Skid Row and its seamy characters, lacks the appeal of a boxoffice hit. That it has been well produced and superbly enacted by a topflight cast there can be no question; its downbeat flavor and the unpleasant aspects of dope addiction which motivates a rather chilling climax look to militate against heavy acceptance by general audiences."

In The Radio Times Guide to Films, Ronald Bergan gave the film 3/5 stars, writing: "British-born director Philip Leacock, whose Hollywood movies tackled strong themes, gets powerful performances from Burl Ives as a judge, and Shelley Winters as Darren's drug-addicted mother."
