= Bud Billiken Club =

African-American youth social club in Chicago, Illinois

- Formation: 1923; 103 years ago
- Founder: Robert Sengstacke Abbott; Lucius Harper
- Type: Social Club
- Legal status: Known as Bud Billiken Youth (since 1972)
- Purpose: Supporting Chicago, Illinois' African–American youth with financial and academic help.
- Location: Bronzeville, Chicago, Illinois, United States
- Owner: Chicago Defender
- Key people: David Kellum

The Bud Billiken Club was a social club for African–American youth in Chicago, Illinois, established in 1923, by the Chicago Defender founder Robert Sengstacke Abbott and its editor, Lucius Harper. The Bud Billiken Club was formed as part of the Defender Junior, the children's page in the newspaper, to encourage reading, appropriate social conduct, and involvement in the community, among the young people of Chicago. Since 1972, the Bud Billiken Club has been known as Bud Billiken Youth. 90 years after it was founded, the organization has grown into a year-round program that supports youth with financial and academic help. They also continue to shine the light on outstanding young people who might have otherwise gone unnoticed.

== History ==
Initially, Abbott had created a day for the members of the Bud Billiken Club and the youth who sold his newspapers to be an annual November event. However, by 1929 the day of fun had morphed into a summer-time celebration and parade, dubbed in 1929 as the Bud Billiken Day Parade. The parade is noted as the largest parade and picnic of its kind in the United States, and draws over a million viewers each year. The Club was dedicated to supporting Chicago’s black youth, and frequently paid tribute to outstanding individuals. In 1935, the Club honored Cleotis Brittenum of Holly Springs, Mississippi for selling more Defender subscriptions “than any other Billiken.” At the annual Parade Cleotis rode in style on a white and gold float with the American Legion Drum and Bugle Corps broadcasting his ride through the South Side.

=== Origins ===
The billiken, a smiling, rotund, elfin creature, popular in the early 1900s, became the mascot for the Bud Billiken Club when Abbott spotted a jolly deity on the door of a Chinese restaurant; upon learning that the jolly deity was the protector of children, he adopted the billiken as mascot of the Club. It was believed to be a character in Chinese mythology, but was actually created by an American woman in 1908. Nevertheless, the figure still represented the guardian angel and patron of children.

Later in 1923, the eleven-year-old boy Willard Motley submitted a drawing to the Chicago Defender of a pudgy and cheerful boy, which Abbott named the "new Billikin" and placed on the paper’s children’s page, the Defender Junior. Known as “the first Billiken,” Motley continued to pen drawings for the Defender Junior for the next seven years.

The name "Bud Billiken" is a pseudonym that Abbott selected for the organization, combining his own nickname "Bud" with "Billiken."

The “Rules of the Bud Billiken Club” guided youth to take pride in their race and to strive towards middle-class respectability. It was also meant as a way to give underprivileged children a creative outlet and a chance to shine in the limelight. Over the years Bud Billiken became the mascot not only for the children’s page, but for the whole newspaper. Abbott organized dozens of Bud Billiken Clubs nationwide for children who pledged to read the Defender.

=== Programs and events ===
The Bud Billiken Club sponsors scholarships, and assists young people with job training, internships, and college recruitment. They regularly feature outstanding Chicago youth through their volunteer work and essay contests. The Club also organizes, in conjunction with Chicago Defender Charities, school supply giveaways, reduced rates on computers and Internet service, and even things such as prom dress donations. There is also focus on creating safe communities through conflict resolution and promoting education.

Each year there is a Bud Billiken Contest to determine the Parade's King, Queen and Royal Court. The winners are determined based on the amount of Chicago Defender subscriptions sold and a written and oral essay. The contest is open to children ages eight to eleven and titles include King, Queen, Prince, Princess, Lord, and Lady. Though all are awarded, the King and Queen receive the grand prize of a trip to Disney World. The winners are announced each year at the Bud Billiken Day Parade and participate in "a week of fun", including riding a float in the parade and visiting various places around the city as members of the Royal Court.

== See also ==
- Bud Billiken Parade and Picnic
