= Christine Moore Howell =

American businesswoman

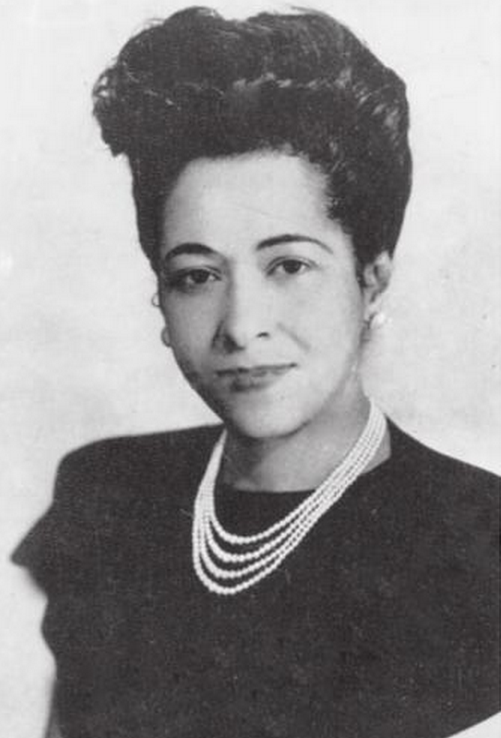
- Howell circa 1950
- Born: Christine Moore; March 19, 1899; Princeton, New Jersey
- Died: December 13, 1972 (aged 73); New Brunswick, New Jersey
- Education: Princeton High School
- Known for: Cosmetics; Hairdresser
- Spouse: Dr. Edward Gaylord Howell
- Parent(s): William Moore (1863-1920); Adelaide Williams

Christine Moore Howell (March 19, 1899 – December 13, 1972) was a hair care product businesswoman who founded Christine Cosmetics where she formulated her own line of cosmetics and hair care products. She was the head of the New Jersey Board of Beauty Culture Control. She was the first African-American to graduate from Princeton High School.

The white people were enraged because I, a Negro, had gained the post.

— Christine Moore Howell in Ebony magazine on her appointment to the New Jersey Board of Beauty Culture Control

== Biography ==
She was born on March 19, 1899, as Christine Moore in Princeton, New Jersey, to William Moore Sr. (1863–1920) and Adelaide Williams, both from Hillsboro, North Carolina. Her siblings were Bessie Moore, Arthur C. Moore, and William Moore Jr. Her father migrated from Hillsboro, North Carolina, to Princeton, New Jersey, where he opened a shop buying and selling used clothes and furniture to the university students. She attended Princeton High School, where she was the first African-American to graduate.

She opened a beauty shop in one of the buildings that William now owned. She studied chemistry in Paris and when she returned she formulated a line of cosmetics.

In 1924 she married Dr. Edward Gaylord Howell of Darien, Connecticut.

In 1935 Harold Giles Hoffman, the Governor of New Jersey appointed her to the newly formed New Jersey Board of Beauty Culture Control, where she became chairman.

She died on December 13, 1972, and was interred in Princeton Cemetery.

== Publications ==
- Beauty Culture and Care of the Hair (1936)

== See also ==
- Madam C. J. Walker and Marjorie Joyner of Chicago, Illinois
