= Bud Billiken Parade and Picnic =

African-American parade in Chicago, Illinois

- Status: Active
- Genre: Parade
- Date: Every second Saturday in August
- Frequency: Annual
- Locations: East 35th to 55th Streets on South Dr. Martin Luther King Jr. Drive: Bronzeville; Grand Boulevard; Washington Park; Chicago, Illinois
- Country: United States
- Years active: 1929–present
- Inaugurated: August 11, 1929; 97 years ago
- Founder: Robert Sengstacke Abbott (founder)
- Most recent: August 8, 2026
- Next event: August 14, 2027
- Website: budbillikenparade.org

The Bud Billiken Parade and Picnic (also known as The Bud Billiken Day Parade) is an annual parade held since 1929 in Chicago, Illinois. The Bud Billiken Day Parade is the largest African-American parade in the United States. Held annually on the city's south side on the second Saturday in August, the parade route travels on Dr. Martin Luther King Drive through the Bronzeville and Washington Park neighborhoods.

At the end of the parade, in the historic Washington public park is a picnic and festival. Robert S. Abbott, the founder and publisher of the Chicago Defender newspaper, created the fictional character of Bud Billiken, which he featured in a youth advice column in his paper. David Kellum, co-founder of the newspaper sponsored Bud Billiken Club and longtime parade coordinator suggested the parade as a celebration of African-American life.

Since its beginning, the parade has featured celebrities, politicians, businessmen, civic organizations and youth. It is considered the second-largest parade in the United States, whose focus is on celebrating youth, education, and African-American life. The parade is also cited as the "back-to-school" celebration, marking the end of summer vacation and resuming of school for Chicago's youth.

== History ==
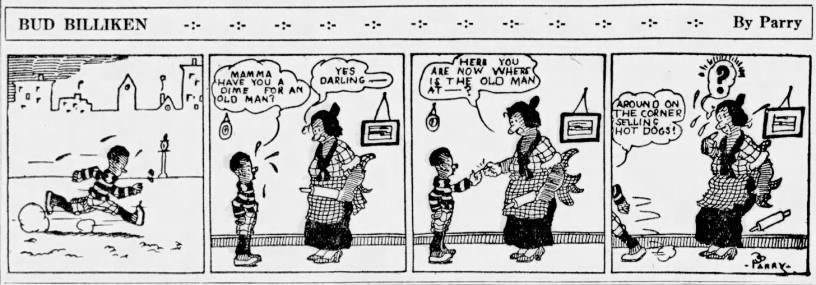
A 1926 Bud Billiken comic strip

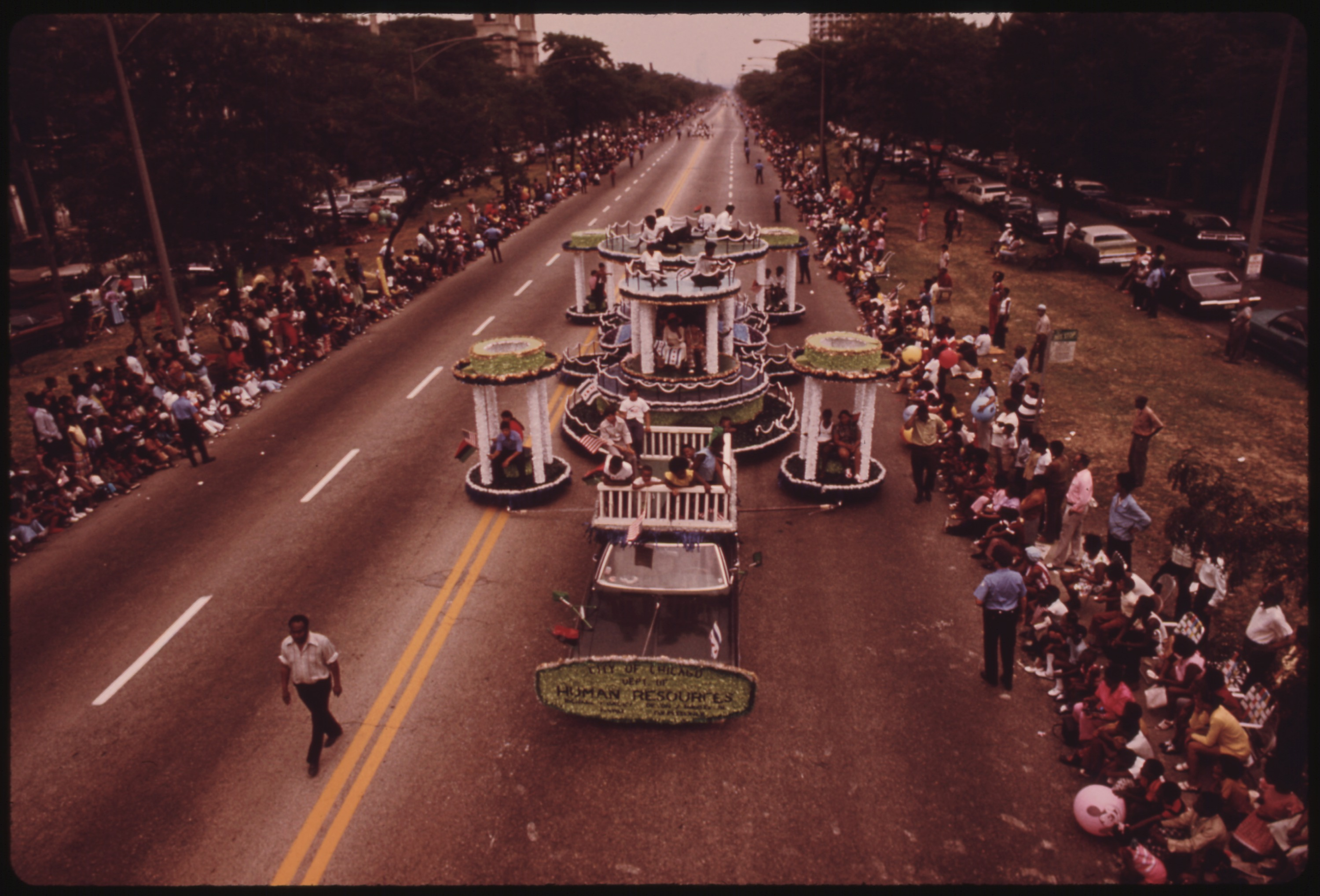
The Chicago Department of Human Resource float in the 1973 parade. Photo by John H. White.

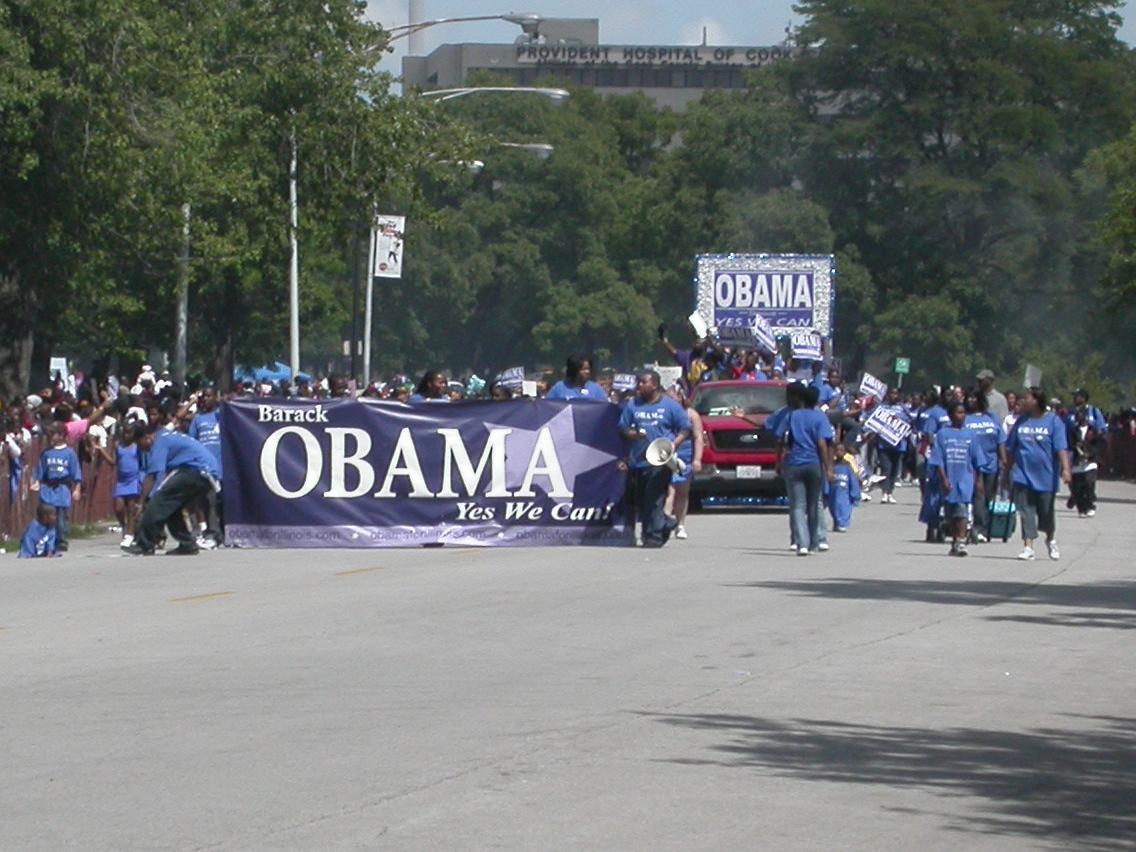
A Barack Obama float for 2004 U.S. Senate race in the 2004 parade.

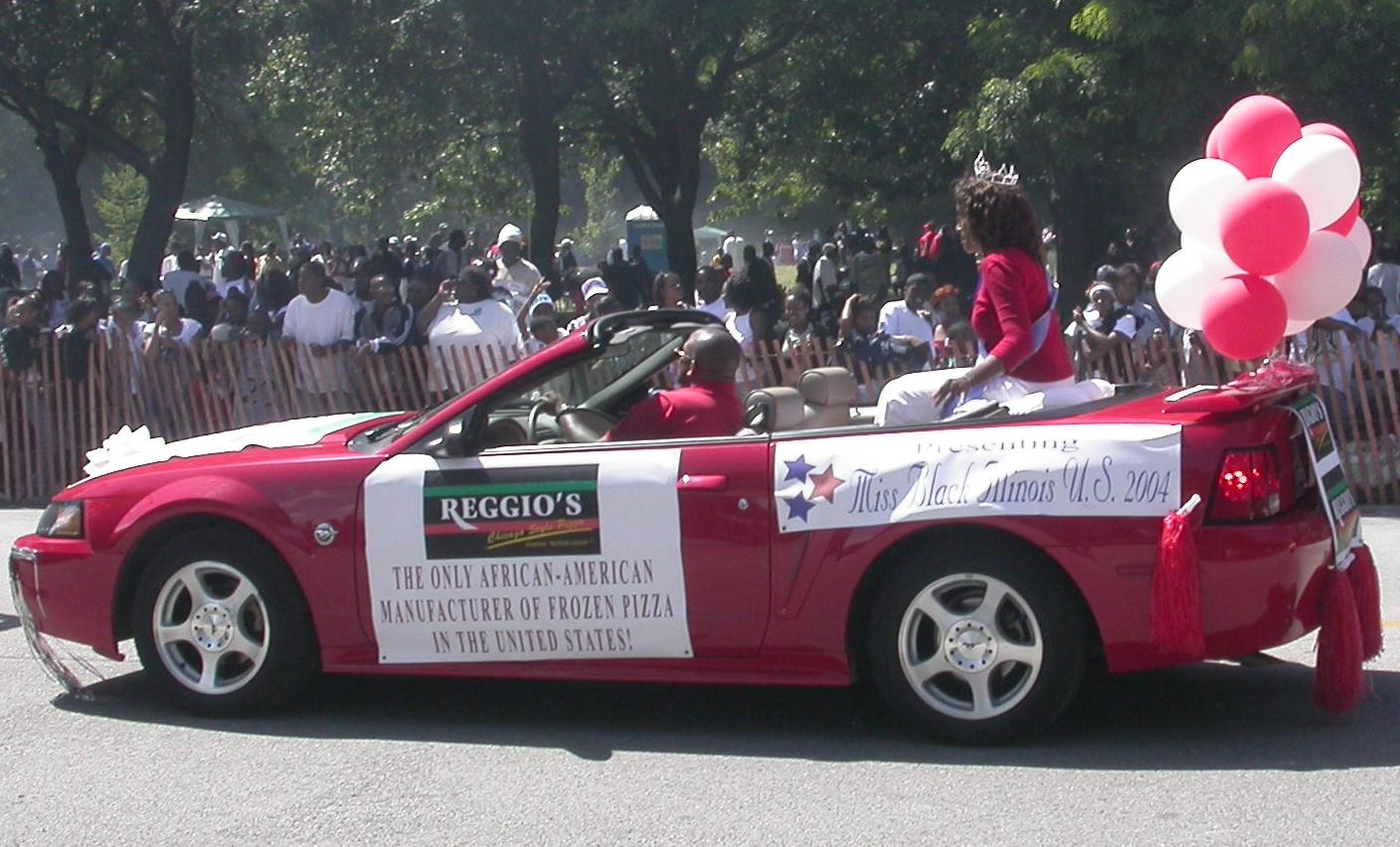
Miss Black Illinois in the 2004 parade.

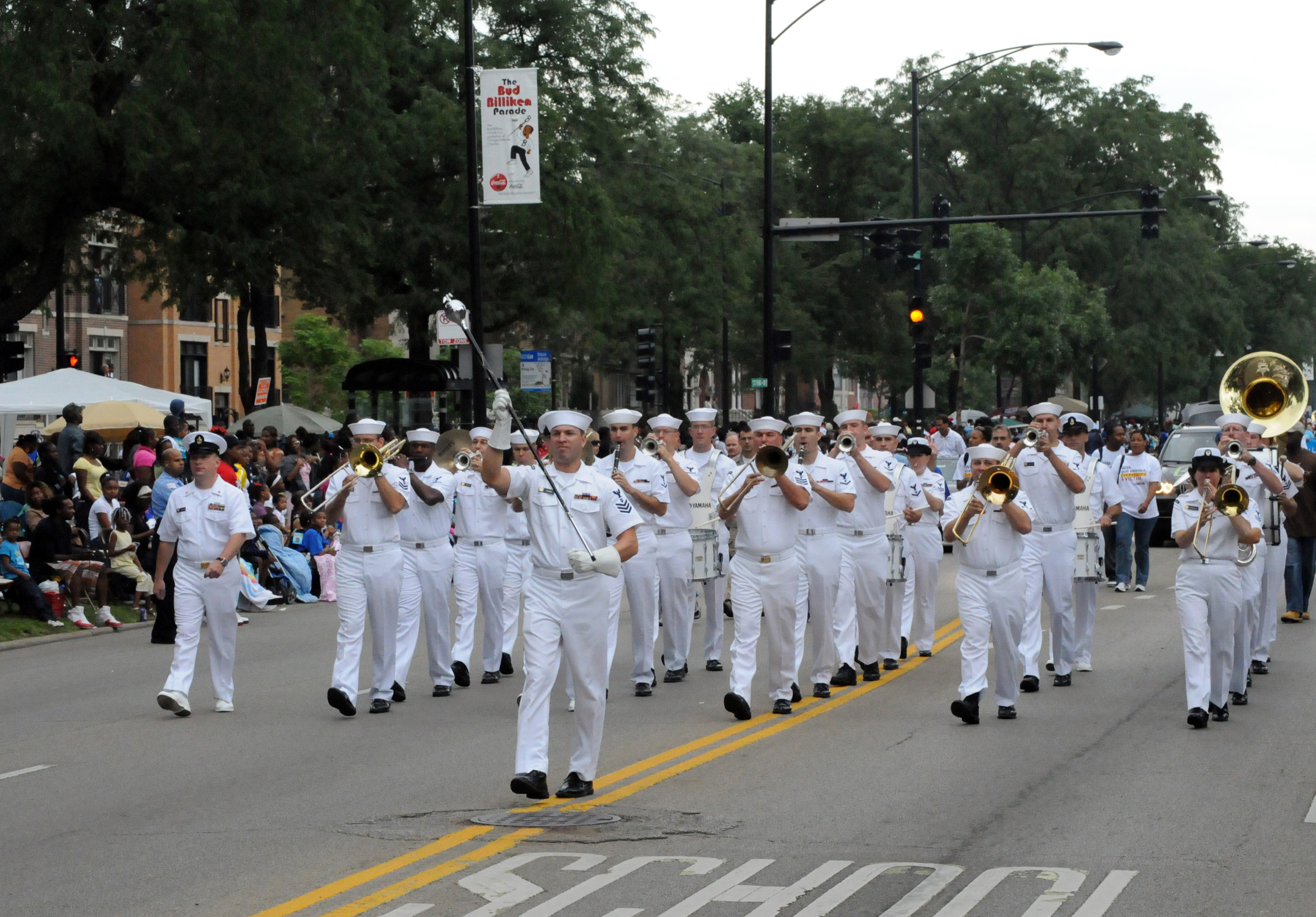
A U.S. Navy band marches in the 2008 parade.

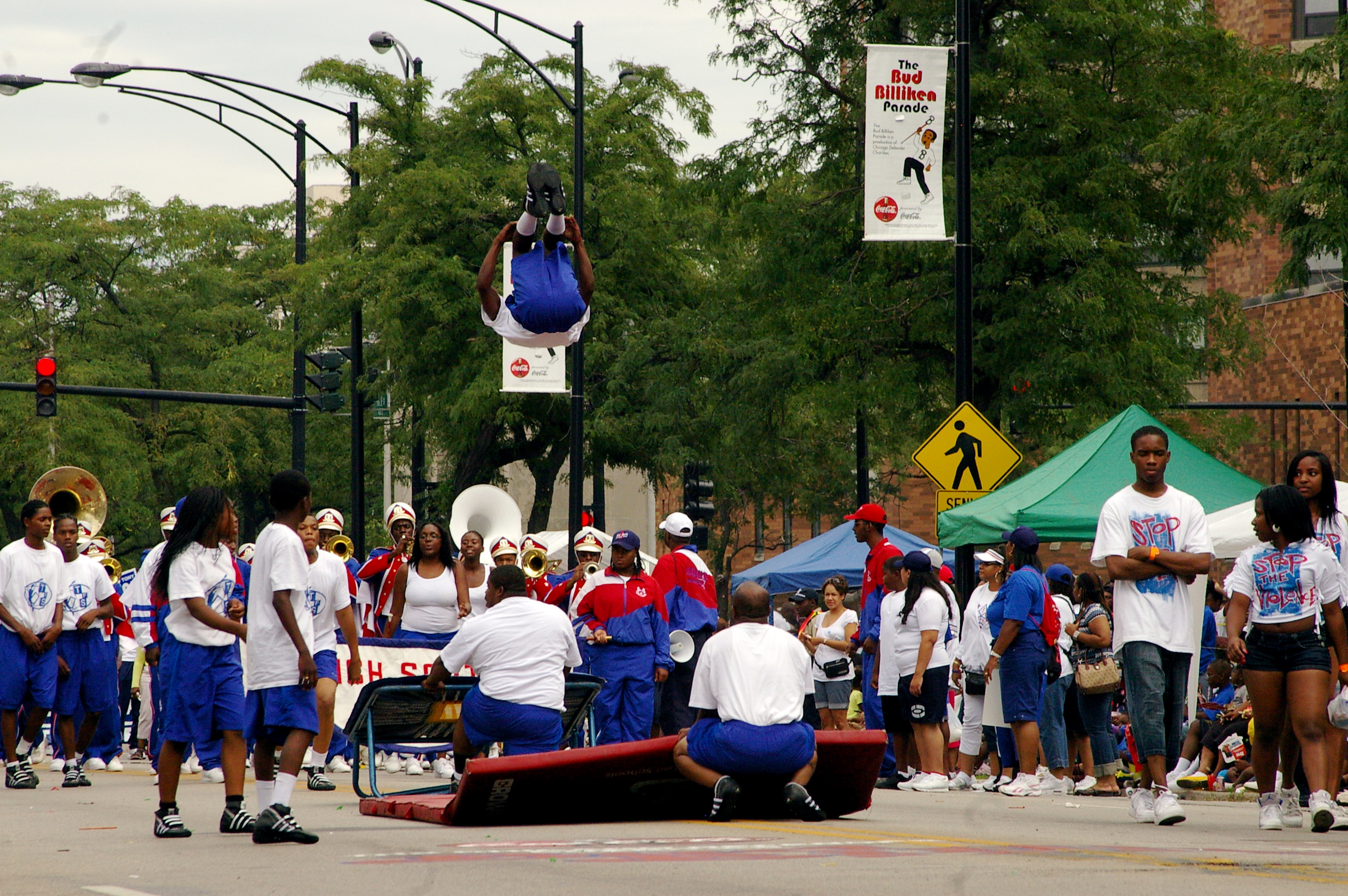
An anti-violence group for a Chicago high school in the 2008 parade.

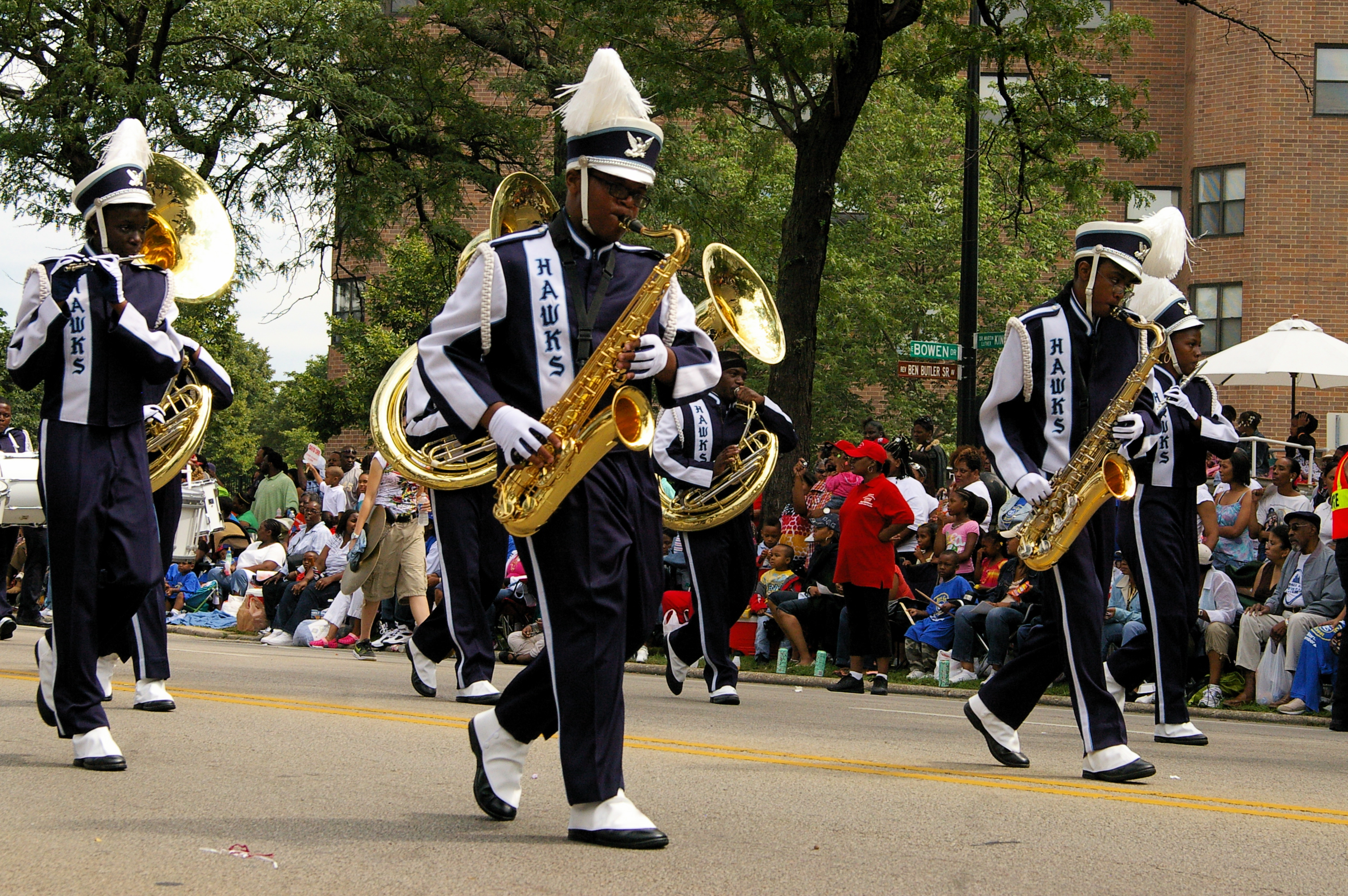
Hillcrest High School marching band in the 2008 parade.

Bud Billiken is a fictional character created in 1923 by Abbott, who had been considering adding a youth section to the Chicago Defender newspaper. While dining at a Chinese restaurant he noticed a Billiken. Some of the early Billiken columns were written by Willard Motley, who later became a prominent novelist. In the early 1930s, names of international youth were listed in the "Bud Billiken" section of the newspaper every week. Between 1930 and 1934, approximately 10,000 names appeared and were archived in the Carter G. Woodson Regional Library of the Chicago Public Library.

During the Great Depression, Abbott featured the Bud Billiken character in his newspaper as a symbol of pride, happiness and hope for black residents. The character gained prominence in a comic strip and the Chicago Defender newspaper. The parade began in 1929, when David Kellum initiated it as a celebration of the "unity in diversity for the children of Chicago". It has since grown to become a locally televised event and the second-largest parade in the nation.

The parade, which began on August 11, 1929, now includes politicians, beauty queens, celebrities, musical performers, and dozens of marching, tumbling and dancing groups. It has grown from a locally sponsored event to one with major corporate presence and is seen as a signal of the impending end of summer and beginning of the new school year. As such the parade sponsors raise money for college scholarships for local youth.

The parade route has changed over the years. The original route was along Michigan Avenue beginning at 31st Street, then turned east into Washington Park. Complaints for north–south traffic flow caused rerouting the parade route to South Parkway (now named Dr. Martin Luther King Jr. Drive), which runs directly into the park. At times, street repairs have necessitated use of the Michigan route, but the current route is now the King Drive route. Freeman Gosden and Charles Correll of Amos 'n' Andy were the first guests in the first parade. Robert S. Abbott led the first parade in his Rolls-Royce. Dr. Marjorie Stewart Joyner, president of the Chicago Defender Charities, Inc., organized the parade for over 50 years.

Numerous high-profile celebrities and dignitaries have attended the parade over the years, including U.S. President Harry S. Truman, Michael Jordan, Barack Obama, Joe Louis, Muhammad Ali, Duke Ellington, Adelaide Hall, Oprah Winfrey, Aretha Franklin, Diana Ross, Lena Horne, James Brown, Ethel Waters, Cab Calloway, Paul Robeson, Chaka Khan, George Clinton, and Billie Holiday. Truman rode alongside John H. Sengstacke, who was Abbott's nephew and took over the Chicago Defender in 1948, and Mayor Richard J. Daley in the 1956 Parade.

Recent parades have featured popular musical acts as concert performers at the post-parade picnic. In 2006, approximately 26 million people saw the parade, including 25 million television viewers and 1.2 million attendees. The 2006 parade included 74,000 participants and 160 floats and vehicles. The 2008 parade was dedicated to actor and comedian Bernie Mac (star of The Bernie Mac Show) and a native of Chicago; he died an hour before the start of the parade.

In 1993, a request by a black LGBT group to participate in the parade was declined by the organizers. Following legal action and the involvement of Lambda Legal, the Ad Hoc Committee of Proud Black Lesbians and Gays was allowed to participate in the parade the following year. The 2020 parade, marking its 91st year, saw the first-ever cancellation, due to the COVID-19 pandemic. A "scaled down" event was held in 2021.

== Parade ==
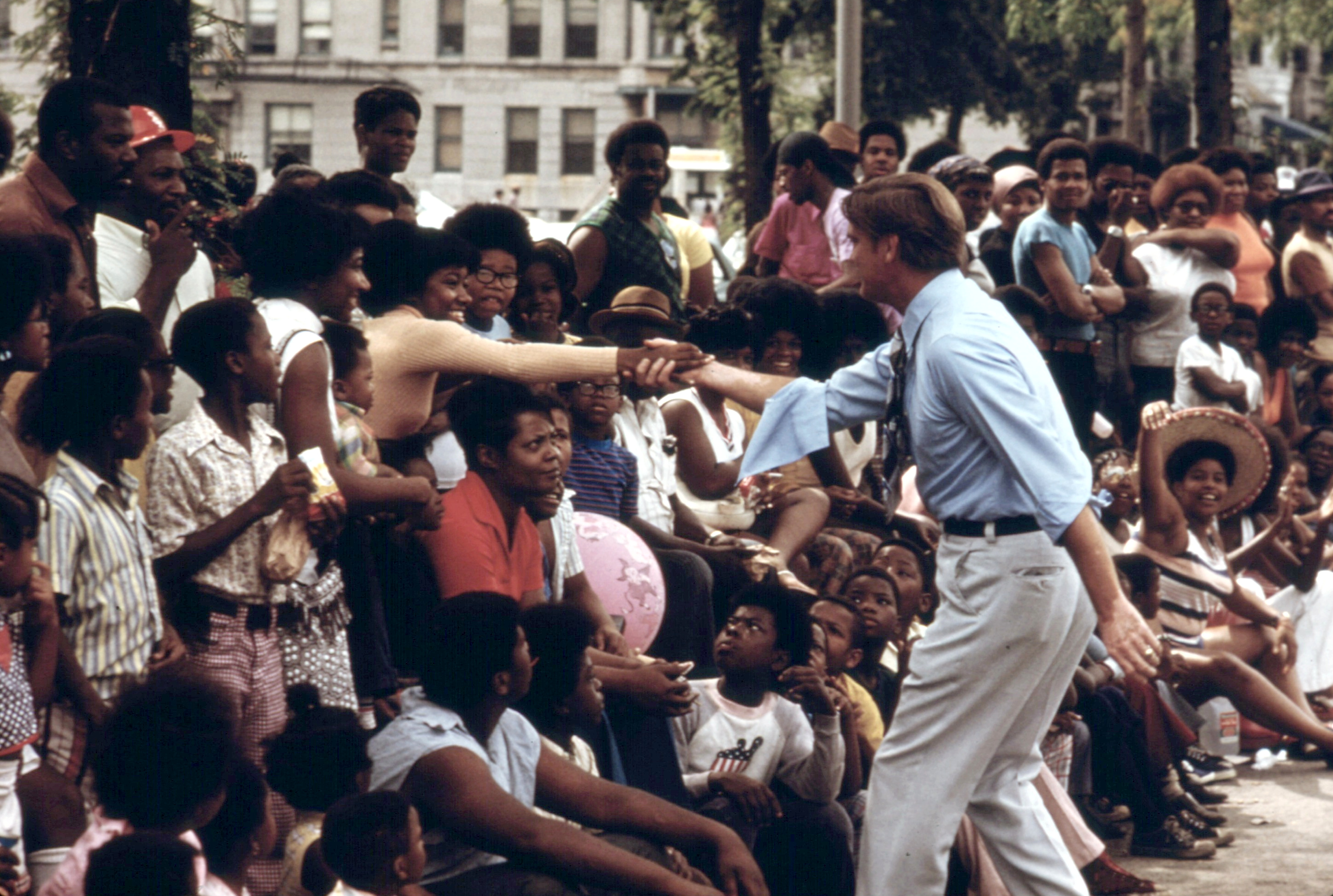
Illinois Governor Dan Walker at the 1973 parade. Photo by John H. White.

The parade has categorized contests for participants such as best float, and best marching band. It takes place in Chicago's Bronzeville neighborhood, starting at 35th Street and Dr. Martin Luther King Drive at the southern border of the Douglas community area, south of the landmark Victory Monument. It continues south to 55th Street in Washington Park. This route covers approximately 2 miles (3.2 km). This route takes the parade through the Grand Boulevard and Washington Park community areas.

=== Grand marshal ===
A notable person or persons are invited each year to serve as grand marshal, often featuring politicians, musicians, or entertainers. Chicago native Chance the Rapper served as the Grand Marshal for the 88th annual parade in 2017. Chicago native and singer Chaka Khan served as the Grand Marshal at the 2014 parade. Rapper T.I. served as Grand Marshal for the 83rd annual parade in 2012.

=== Theme ===
The Bud Billiken Parade is themed every year by the parade committee. The tradition began in 1940 when the parade organizers themed the parade "Americanism" to demonstrate patriotism in the US within the African-American community. Other themes over the years:

Bud Billiken Parade Theme
Year	Theme
1940	"Americanism"
1945	"The Return of The Conquering Hero"
1949	"Christmas In Summertime"
1951	"Hi Champ!"
1954	"Hi Bud, Congratulations!"
1958	"Youth In Orbit"
1959	"Pan-American Panorama"
1960	"Hi Bud, Let's Grow with Chicago"
1967	"Keeping A Cool Summer."
1968	"Honor Black Heroes"
1970	"Bridging the Generation Gap."
1971	"Involving the Community in Love and Smiles."
1977	"Tribute to Dr. Joyner"
1984	"A Salute to Scouting"
1987	"Step Up To A Better Life."
1988	"Back To School Special."
1989	"Children Are Resources of The Future."
1991	"The Future is Yours, Go for it!"
1992	"Children Make Family Pride Come Alive."
1993	"Education is here to stay. Don't let drugs, gangs and sex get in the way."
1994	"Save Our Children, Stop The Violence."
1995	"Family: In Partnerships Supporting One Another."
1996	"Strengthening Family Through Our Youth."
1997	"Let's Parade the Child Stars of Education."
1999	"Our Children, Our Future."
2000	"Our Children, Our Pride."
2001	"We Are Family."
2004	"A Time to Encourage and Educate Our Youth."
2009	"Education, Yes We Can: A Salute to President Barack Obama"
2010	"Education: It's the American Way."
2011	"Education: Now More Than Ever."
2012	"Education: Built To Last"/"A Tribute To President Barack Obama."
2013	"Empowerment of Youth through Education."
2014	"Education: The One Tool You Can't Lose."
2015	"Education: That's an Order."
2016	"Uniting the Community through Education for 87 Years."
2017	"Honoring our Hometown Heroes"
2018	"Back to School, Back to Work, Back to Life, Back to Bud"
2019	"90 Years of Excellence, Legacy on Parade"
2021	“Back to School, Back to Life and Back to Bud Billiken"
2022	"Power of Bud Billiken 365"
2023	"Parading in Peace Block by Block
2024	"95 Years of Legacy"

=== Broadcast ===
The parade has been televised for over 40 years, beginning in 1978 on WGN-TV; which broadcast the parade until 2012. WCIU-TV covered the parade beginning in 2012 after it was canceled from WGN-TV but later canceled it in 2014. WLS-TV has been broadcasting the parade since 1984. The 89th Annual Parade took place on August 11, 2018. BET and Centric premiered the parade on their networks in 2012. On August 8, 2020, WLS-TV aired a television special for the 91st Annual Bud Billiken Parade in place of the 2020 parade which was canceled due to COVID-19 concerns.

=== After parade activities ===
The parade begins at 10 a.m. After the parade, visitors are welcomed to stay in Washington Park for the "after-parade-activities". The "after-parade-activities" has various festivities and vendor booths. The post-parade festivities often include a concert. The 2006 parade featured Yung Joc, and the 2007 parade featured Pretty Ricky. However, it seems neither "after-parade-activities" included a concert.

== Notable events ==
=== 2003 concert ===
The 2003 parade featured B2K. The concert was free with virtually unlimited space in the park for viewing. However, the crowd became unruly causing the concert to be curtailed. Over 40 attendees were taken to hospitals as a result of injuries in the violence, including two teenagers who were shot.

=== 2007 parade ===
At the 78th annual parade in 2007, then–U.S. Senator Barack Obama served as the Grand Marshal for the second year in a row. Chicago Mayor Richard M. Daley attended, and march participants included U.S. Senator Dick Durbin, Lieutenant Governor of Illinois Pat Quinn and the Rev. Al Sharpton. One float represented the Chicago 2016 Committee and included past Chicago Olympians Bob Pickens, Willie May, Diane Simpson-Bundy and Kenny Johnson as well as the son of Danell Nicholson. The Chicago Bulls' mascot made a guest appearance.

== Restructuring ==
The Chicago Defender Charities underwent a major restructuring in 2017. Myiti Sengstacke–Rice is board president of the Chicago Defender Charities and Bud Billiken Parade Chair. Sengstacke–Rice is the great-grandniece of Robert Sengstacke Abbott, granddaughter of John Herman Henry Sengstacke, founder of the Chicago Defender Charities and daughter of the late famed photojournalist, Robert Abbott Sengstacke.

== See also ==
- Bud Billiken Club
