= Ella Fitzgerald Sings Songs from the Soundtrack of "Let No Man Write My Epitaph" =

Studio album by Ella Fitzgerald
- Released: 1960
- Recorded: April 14–19, 1960
- Studio: United Western (Hollywood)
- Genre: Jazz
- Length: 41:58
- Label: Verve
- Producer: Norman Granz

Ella Fitzgerald chronology
Ella Wishes You a Swinging Christmas (1960)	Ella Fitzgerald Sings Songs from the Soundtrack of "Let No Man Write My Epitaph" (1960)	Ella Fitzgerald Sings the Harold Arlen Songbook (1961)

CD release artwork

Professional ratings
Review scores
Source	Rating
Allmusic	4/5 stars
Encyclopedia of Popular Music	4/5 stars
The Penguin Guide to Jazz Recordings	3.5/4 stars
Downbeat	3/5 stars

Ella Fitzgerald Sings Songs from the Soundtrack of "Let No Man Write My Epitaph" is a 1960 album by the American jazz singer Ella Fitzgerald, accompanied by the pianist Paul Smith. Let No Man Write My Epitaph was a 1960 Hollywood crime drama film featuring Fitzgerald.

Until 2014 this album was only available on CD as The Intimate Ella, and is considered one of Ella's greatest recordings. Ella's 1950 Decca album Ella Sings Gershwin, is in a similar vein, with Ella accompanied by the pianist Ellis Larkins.

The album hints at a depth of emotional understanding that critics often complained was missing in Ella's reading of jazz lyrics, and once again establishes her as one of the supreme interpreters of the Great American Songbook. Scott Yanow's review of the album (on Allmusic) declared, "Listeners who [think] Ella Fitzgerald... had trouble giving the proper emotional intensity to lyrics will be surprised by this sensitive and often haunting set".

In 2020, the album was rereleased as part of the Verve compilation The Complete Piano Duets.

DownBeat reviewer Barbara Gardner gave the album 3 stars, calling it a "terribly flat drab collection of torch tunes. "There are so many elements working against this album that the miracle of its holding together and being listenable at all is the result totally of the talent of Miss Fitzgerald.

== Track listing ==
For the 1960 Verve LP release; Verve MG V-4043; Re-issued as The Intimate Ella in 1989 on CD, Verve-PolyGram 839 838-2; Re-issued under its original title and release number in 2014 on CD/SACD

Side One:

1. "Black Coffee" (Sonny Burke, Paul Francis Webster) – 3:27
2. "Angel Eyes" (Earl Brent, Matt Dennis) – 3:27
3. "I Cried for You" (Gus Arnheim, Arthur Freed, Abe Lyman) – 3:26
4. "I Can't Give You Anything but Love, Baby" (Dorothy Fields, Jimmy McHugh) – 3:28
5. "Then You've Never Been Blue" (Ted Fio Rito, Sam M. Lewis, Frances Langford, Joe Young) – 3:10
6. "I Hadn't Anyone Till You" (Ray Noble) – 2:49
7. "My Melancholy Baby" (Ernie Burnett, George Norton) – 2:57

Side Two:

1. "Misty" (Johnny Burke, Erroll Garner) – 2:51
2. "September Song" (Maxwell Anderson, Kurt Weill) – 3:40
3. "One for My Baby (and One More for the Road)" (Harold Arlen, Johnny Mercer) – 4:17
4. "Who's Sorry Now?" (Burt Kalmar, Harry Ruby, Ted Snyder) – 3:26
5. "I'm Getting Sentimental Over You" (George Bassman, Ned Washington) – 2:36
6. "Reach for Tomorrow" (McHugh, Washington) – 2:24

== Personnel ==
Recorded April 14–19, 1960 at United Western Recorders, Hollywood, Los Angeles:

- Ella Fitzgerald - Vocals
- Paul Smith - Piano
