= Philip Leacock =

Television and film director, producer (1917–1990)

- Born: Philip David Charles Leacock; 8 October 1917; London, England
- Died: 14 July 1990 (aged 72); London, England
- Occupations: Television and film director, producer

Philip David Charles Leacock (8 October 1917 – 14 July 1990) was an English television and film director and producer. His brother was documentary filmmaker Richard Leacock.

== Career ==
Born in London, England, Leacock spent his childhood in the Canary Islands. He began his career directing documentaries and later turned to fiction films.

He was known for his films about children, particularly The Kidnappers (US: The Little Kidnappers, 1953), which gained Honorary Juvenile Acting Oscars for two of its performers, and The Spanish Gardener (1956) starring Dirk Bogarde. He also directed High Tide at Noon (1958) and Innocent Sinners (1958) with Flora Robson.

He began to work mainly in Hollywood, where he made The Rabbit Trap (1959) with Ernest Borgnine and Take a Giant Step (1959) about a black youth's encounter with racism, both under contract to Hecht-Hill-Lancaster Productions. He followed with Let No Man Write My Epitaph (1960) about an aspiring young pianist whose mother is a drug addict, and The War Lover (1962) with Steve McQueen, based on John Hersey's novel about a World War II pilot. Around this time, he began to work in television, directing episodes of Gunsmoke, Route 66, The Waltons, The Defenders, and The New Land. He also directed many segments of the American series Eight Is Enough (1977–1981).

He retired in 1987 after directing a three-part television drama about the Salem witch hunts titled Three Sovereigns for Sister Sarah, which starred Vanessa Redgrave.

Leacock died while on vacation with his family in London on 14 July 1990.

== Selected filmography ==
Feature films:

- Island People (1940)
- Riders of the New Forest (1948)
- Life in Her Hands (1951)
- The Brave Don't Cry (1952)
- Appointment in London (1952)
  - Raiders in the Sky - American title
- The Kidnappers (1953)
  - The Little Kidnappers - American title
- Escapade (1955)
- The Spanish Gardener (1956)
- High Tide at Noon (1957)
- Innocent Sinners (1958)
- The Rabbit Trap (1959)
- Take a Giant Step (1959)
- Hand in Hand (1960)
- Let No Man Write My Epitaph (1960)
- 13 West Street (1962)
- Reach for Glory (1962)
- The War Lover (1962)
- Tamahine (1963)
- Adam's Woman (1970)
- Three Sovereigns for Sarah (1985)

TV movies:

- The Birdmen (1971)
- When Michael Calls (1972)
- The Great Man's Whiskers (1972)
- The Daughters of Joshua Cabe (1972)
- Baffled! (1973)
- Dying Room Only (1973)
- Key West (1973)
- The Thanksgiving Story (1973)
- Killer on Board (1978)
- Wild and Wooly (1978)
- The Curse of King Tut's Tomb (1980)
- Angel City (1980)
- The Two Lives of Carol Letner (1981)
- The Wild Women of Chastity Gulch (1982)
