= Robert Sengstacke Abbott =

African American publisher and lawyer (1870–1940)

- Abbott circa 1919
- Born: December 24, 1870; St. Simons, Georgia, U.S.
- Died: February 29, 1940 (aged 69); Chicago, Illinois, U.S.
- Resting place: Lincoln Cemetery (Blue Island, Illinois)
- Education: Hampton University; Kent College of Law
- Occupations: Lawyer; Newspaper publisher; Editor
- Years active: 1901–1940
- Known for: Founder and publisher of The Chicago Defender newspaper and the Bud Billiken Parade and Picnic
- Spouses: Helen Thornton Morrison (m. 1918; div. 1933) Edna Brown Denison (m. 1934)
- Relatives: John H. Sengstacke (nephew); Robert A. Sengstacke (great–nephew)

Robert Sengstacke Abbott (December 24, 1870 – February 29, 1940) was an American lawyer, newspaper publisher and editor. Abbott founded The Chicago Defender in 1905, which grew to have the highest circulation of any black-owned newspaper in the country.

Abbott founded the Bud Billiken Parade and Picnic in August 1929. The parade, which has developed into a celebration for youth, education and African-American life in Chicago, Illinois, is the second largest parade in the United States.

== Biography ==
=== Early life and education ===
Abbot was born on December 24, 1870, in St. Simons, Georgia (although some sources state Savannah, Georgia), to freedman parents, who had been enslaved before the American Civil War. The Sea Islands were a place of the Gullah people, an African-descended ethnic group who maintained African-inherited cultural traits more strongly than many African Americans in other areas of the South. His father, Thomas Abbott, died when Robert was a baby, and his widowed mother Flora Abbott (née Butler) met and married John H. H. Sengstacke, a mixed-race man of unusual background who had recently come to the US from Germany.

Between 1878 and 1889, Sengstacke lived in the parsonage of Savannah's Pilgrim Congregational Church while his stepfather was the minister. The now-demolished church stood at the intersection of West Bay Street and Albion Street.

Sengstacke's parents were Tama, a freed slave, and her husband Herman Sengstacke, a German sea captain who had a regular route from Hamburg to Savannah. Herman had met Tama at the Georgia port city in 1847, where, after her becoming distressed at a slave sale, he bought and freed her. They married in Charleston, South Carolina, before returning to Georgia, where their interracial marriage was prohibited. Their son, John, was born the next year. Tama died soon after their second child, a daughter, was born, and Herman took the children back to Germany to be raised by family.

Savannah's now-demolished Pilgrim Congregational Church, with the parsonage possibly being the building on the left

John Sengstacke cared for Robert as if he were his own, and with Flora Abbot had seven additional children. Robert was given the middle name Sengstacke to mark his belonging in the family. John Sengstacke had become a Congregationalist missionary as an adult, a teacher, determined to improve the education of African American children, and a publisher, founding the Woodville Times, based in Woodville, Georgia, a town later annexed by Savannah; he wrote, "There is but one church, and all who are born of God are members of it. God made a church, man made denominations. God gave us a Holy Bible, disputing men made different kinds of disciples."

Industrialization underway in the United States, Abbot studied the printing trade at Hampton Institute (now Hampton University), a historically black college in Virginia, from 1892 to 1896. At Hampton, he sang with the Hampton Choir and Quartet, which toured nationally. He earned a law degree from Kent College of Law, Chicago, in 1898.

Abbott became a Prince Hall Freemason at the Oriental Lodge, No. 68, in Chicago.

== Career ==
Abbott tried to set up a law practice, working for a few years in Gary, Indiana, and Topeka, Kansas. He returned home to Georgia for a period, then went back to Chicago, where he could see changes arriving with thousands of new migrants from the rural South as a part of the Great Migration.

=== The Chicago Defender ===
After settling in Chicago, in 1905 Abbott founded The Chicago Defender newspaper with an initial investment of 25¢ (equivalent to $9 in 2025). He started printing in a room at his boarding house; his landlady encouraged him, and he later bought her an eight-room house.

He wanted to push for job opportunities and social justice, and was eager to persuade black people to leave the segregated, Jim Crow South for Chicago. A key part of his distribution network was made up of African-American railroad porters, who were highly respected among black people, and by 1925 they organized a union as the Brotherhood of Sleeping Car Porters. They often sold or distributed the paper on trains. Defender circulation reached 50,000 by 1916; 125,000 by 1918; and more than 200,000 by the early 1920s. Credited with contributing to the Great Migration of rural southern black people to Chicago, the Defender became the most widely circulated black newspaper in the country. It was known as "America's Black Newspaper". Its success resulted in Abbott becoming one of the first self-made millionaires of African-American descent; his business expanded as African Americans moved to the cities and became an urbanized, northern population. From the early 20th century through 1940, 1.5 million black people moved to major cities in the Northeast and Mid-West.

They were eager to know about conditions, to find housing, and to learn more about their new lives in cities. Most were from rural areas of the South. From 1890 to 1908 all the southern states had passed constitutions or laws that raised barriers to voter registration and effectively disenfranchised most black people and many poor whites. They were utterly closed out of the political systems. Schools and other public facilities reserved for black people were typically underfunded and ill-maintained. Legislatures imposed Jim Crow conditions, producing facilities for black people that were "separate" but never "equal" (referring to the Plessy v. Ferguson (1896) case, in which the US Supreme Court ruled that segregated facilities, such as railroad cars providing "separate but equal" conditions, were constitutional). The northern and midwestern industrial centers, where black people could vote and send children to school, were recruiting workers based on expansion of manufacturing and infrastructure to supply the US's expanding population as well as the war in Europe, which started in 1914. The Pennsylvania Railroad and others were expanding at a rapid rate across the North, needing workers for construction and later to serve the train passengers.

The Defender told stories of earlier migrants to the North, giving hope to disenfranchised and oppressed people in the South of other ways to live. Abbott, through his writings in the Chicago Defender, expressed those stories and encouraged people to leave the South for the North. He even set a date of May 15, 1917, for what he called 'The Great Northern Drive' to occur. In his weekly, he showed pictures of Chicago and had numerous classifieds for housing. In addition, Abbott wrote about how awful a place the South was to live in comparison to the idealistic North. Abbott's words described the North as a place of prosperity and justice. This persuasive writing, "thereby made this journal probably the greatest stimulus that the migration had."

Abbott was a fighter, a defender of rights. He listed nine goals as the Defender's "Bible":

1. American race prejudice must be destroyed
2. Opening up all trade unions to black people as well as whites
3. Representation in the President's Cabinet
4. Hiring black engineers, firemen, and conductors on all American railroads, and to all jobs in government
5. Gaining representation in all departments of the police forces over the entire United States
6. Government schools giving preference to American citizens before foreigners
7. Hiring black motormen and conductors on surface, elevated, and motor bus lines throughout America
8. Federal legislation to abolish lynching
9. Full enfranchisement of all American citizens

The Chicago Defender not only encouraged people to migrate north for a better life, but to fight for their rights once they got there. The slogan of the paper and the first goal was "American race prejudice must be destroyed." Sengstacke openly discussed African-American history in his articles, including its difficult issues. He wrote, "Miscegenation began as soon as the African slaves were introduced into the colonial population and continues unabated to this day.... What's more, the opposition to intermarriage has heightened the interest and solidified the feelings of those who resent the injunction of racial distinction in their private and personal affairs." He believed that laws restricting personal choice in a mate violated the constitution and that the "decision of two intelligent people to mutual love and self-sacrifice should not be a matter of public concern." Abbott also published a short-lived periodical called Abbott's Monthly, whose contributor included Chester Himes and Richard Wright. The Defender actively promoted the northward migration of black Southerners, particularly to Chicago; its columns not only reported on, but encouraged the Great Migration.

=== Bud Billiken Parade ===
Bud Billiken is a fictional character created by Abbott in 1923. During the Great Depression, Abbott featured Bud Billiken in the youth column of his newspaper, The Chicago Defender, as a symbol of pride, happiness, and hope for black residents. David Kellum, co-founder of the newspaper, then went on to celebrate this character by starting the "Bud Billiken Parade" in 1929. The parade is held annually in Chicago and is the largest African American parade in the United States. It has since featured celebrities, politicians, businessmen, and many others. It is considered the second largest parade in the United States.

== Baháʼí Faith ==
In 1912, Abbott met ʻAbdu'l-Bahá, head of the Baháʼí Faith, through covering a talk of his during his stay in Chicago during his journeys in the West. By 1924 Abbott and his wife were listed as attending Baháʼí events in Chicago. After inventing the fictional character "Bud Billiken" with David Kellum for articles in the Defender, Abbott established the Bud Billiken Club. In 1929 Abbott and Kellum founded the Bud Billiken Parade and Picnic. It became an occasion for African Americans to celebrate their pride and connections.

Abbott was seeking an atmosphere free of race prejudice. Even in religious communities, he sometimes found that mixed-race African Americans who were light-skinned sometimes also demonstrated prejudice against those who were darker. Abbott officially joined the Baháʼí Faith in 1934. He had found that its convention to elect its National Spiritual Assembly seemed free of prejudice.

== Final years and death ==
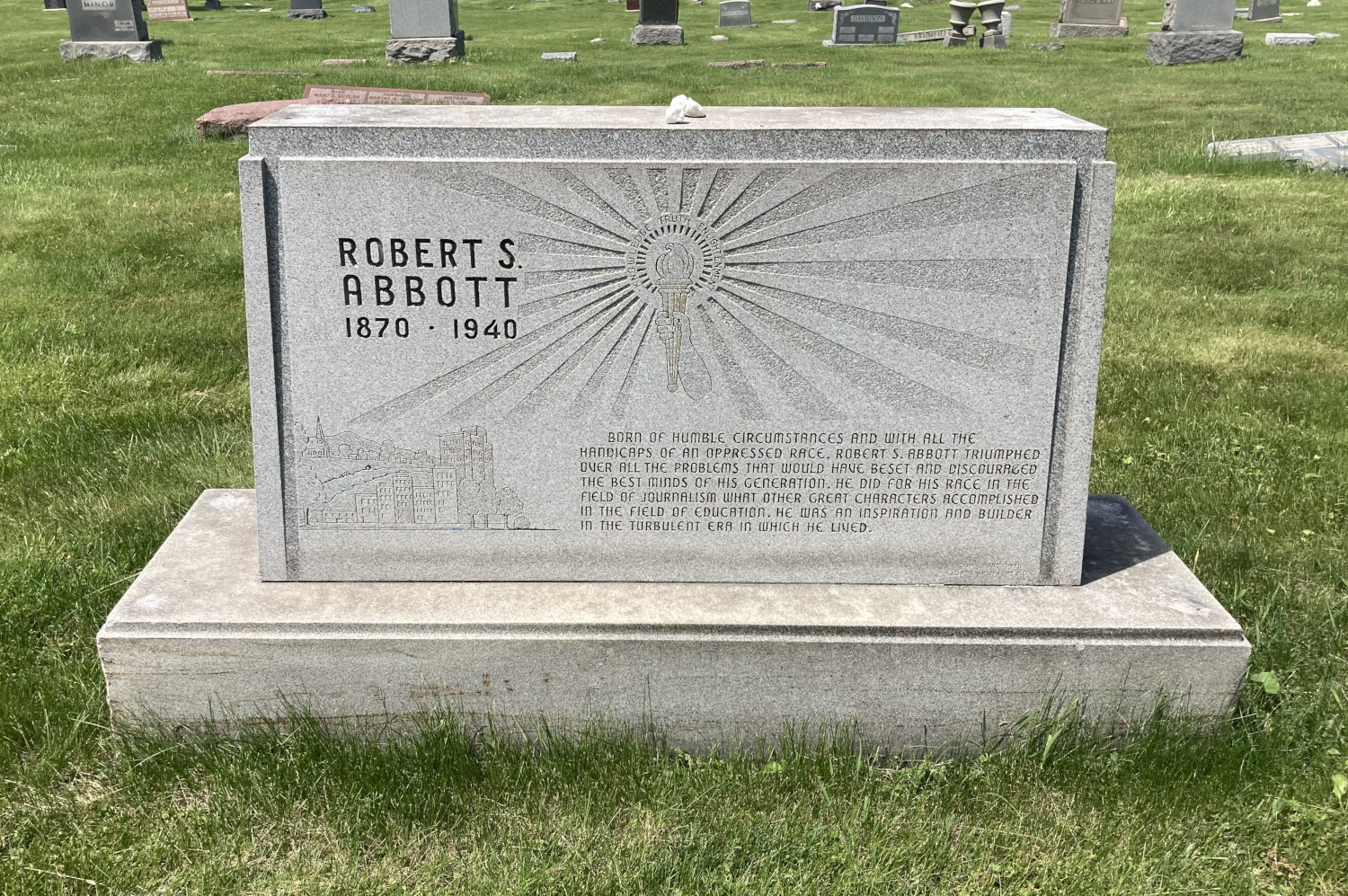
Abbott's grave at Lincoln Cemetery

In 1919, Illinois Governor Frank Lowden appointed Abbott to the Chicago Commission on Race Relations. The commission conducted studies about the changes resulting from the Great Migration; in one period, 5,000 African Americans were arriving in the city every week. The Commission collected data to assess the population and published the book, The Negro in Chicago. Though some of his stepfather Sengstacke's relatives in Germany became Nazis in the 1930s and later, Abbott continued correspondence and economic aid to those who had accepted him and his father's family. He also assisted descendants of Captain Charles Stevens, the former owner of his enslaved birth father before emancipation. With his wealth, Abbott aided the Stevens descendants in Georgia during the Depression, and paid for the education of their children. Abbott died of Bright's disease in 1940 in Chicago. He was buried in Lincoln Cemetery in Blue Island, Illinois. His will left the newspaper in the control of his nephew, John Henry Sengstacke.

== Legacy ==
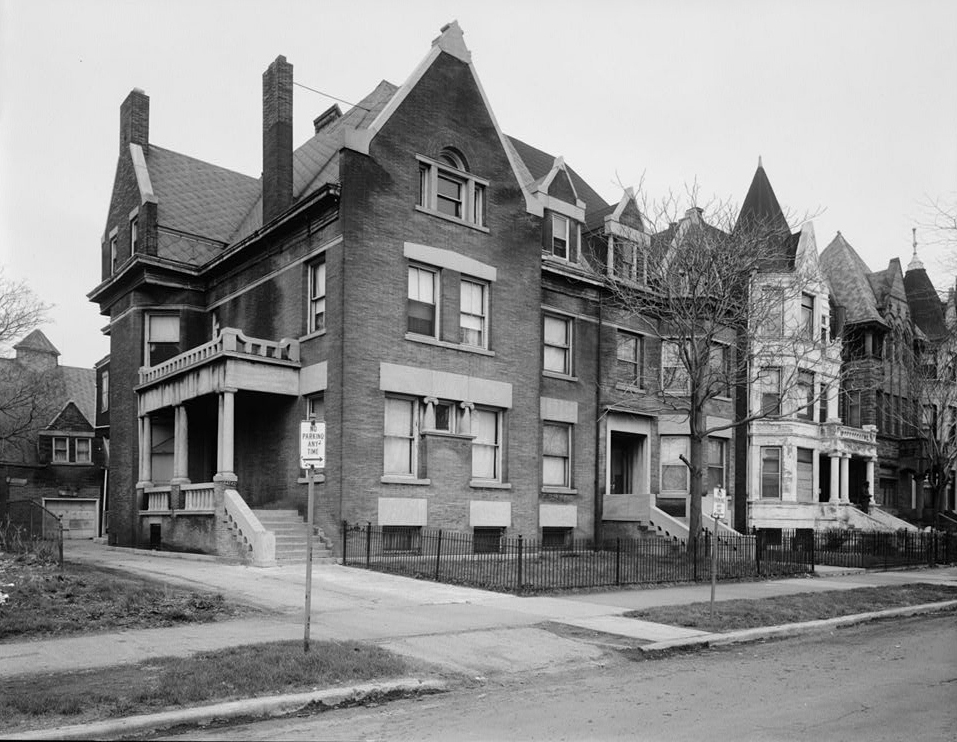
The Robert S. Abbott House

- Founder of the Bud Billiken Parade and Picnic
- The Robert S. Abbott House in Chicago, where he lived from 1926 to his death, was designated a National Historic Landmark in 1976.
- His childhood home in the Woodville neighborhood now in Savannah, Georgia, was designated as a city historic landmark. National Historic Landmark.
- An early biography of him was published in 1955 by Roi Ottley, The Lonely Warrior: The Life and Times of Robert S. Abbott (Chicago: H. Regnery Co., 1955).
- In a 1963 painting, Robert Abbott Founds the Chicago Defender , artist William McBride depicted a young Abbott founding the newspaper. The painting is now in the collection of the DuSable Museum of African American History in Chicago.
- Abbott is featured on the documentary series Profiles of African-American Success.
- In 2017, Abbott was inducted into the Chicago Literary Hall of Fame.

== Sources ==
- Lochard, Metz T. P. (1947). "Phylon Profile, XII: Robert S. Abbott – 'Race Leader'". Phylon. 8 (2): 124–132. doi:10.2307/271719. JSTOR 271719.
- Ottley, Roi (1955). The Lonely Warrior: The Life and Times of Robert S. Abbott. Henry Regnery. OCLC 612885392.
