= 1835 Massachusetts gubernatorial election =

- November 9, 1835

Nominee	Edward Everett	Marcus Morton
Party	Whig	Democratic
Alliance	Anti-Masonic
Popular vote	37,555	25,227
Percentage	57.86%	38.87%
- County results Everett: 40–50% 50–60% 60–70% 70–80% Morton: 50–60%
Governor before election
Samuel T. Armstrong (acting)
Whig
Elected Governor
Edward Everett
Whig

The 1835 Massachusetts gubernatorial election was held on November 9.

Acting Whig Governor Samuel T. Armstrong ran for re-election to a full term in office, but was defeated for the Whig nomination by Edward Everett. In the general election, Armstrong ran without party support but finished a distant third behind Everett and Democrat Marcus Morton.

== Background ==
Governor John Davis resigned in March after his election to the United States Senate, to succeed the retiring Nathaniel Silsbee.

== Nominations ==
=== Whig ===
The Whig convention nominated Edward Everett. Despite the suggestions of Everett, Senator Daniel Webster, and Senator Davis, acting Governor Samuel T. Armstrong would not stand aside, and remained in the race.

=== Anti-Masonic ===
The Anti-Masonic convention nominated Everett as well, recalling his earlier "martyrdom" for the anti-Masonic cause.

However, the party nominated the Democratic candidate for Lieutenant Governor, William Foster, over Whig George Hull, ostensibly because Hull was a Mason. The party also endorsed Martin Van Buren for the presidency in 1836 over Daniel Webster, though some anti-Masons embraced Webster.

== General election ==
=== Candidates ===
- Samuel T. Armstrong, acting governor since March (Independent Whig)
- Edward Everett, U.S. representative from Charlestown (Whig)
- Marcus Morton, former acting governor and nominee since 1828 (Democratic)

=== Campaign ===
Everett was somewhat distressed by the Anti-Masonic campaign in his name, which was conducted by Benjamin F. Hallett and suggested that Everett supported Martin Van Buren over moderate Democrat Hugh Lawson White for president in 1836. However, Everett resolved not to involve himself in Democratic politics on the advice of Caleb Cushing. The Democratic press joined Hallett's campaign, likely to draw Anti-Masonic votes away from the Whigs and into the Democratic camp.

A separate campaign was conducted by George Bancroft to draw the Working Men's Party vote, which was largely rural and Western, to Marcus Morton. Morton's campaign was largely based on "radical" egalitarian opposition to aristocratic rule in the state.

In total, the state was divided among the Everett Whigs, Armstrong Whigs, Everett Anti-Masons, Van Buren Anti-Masons, "integrant" Van Buren Democrats, agrarian Democrats, and finally a dissatisfied "Free Bridge" group drawing from all parties.

=== Results ===
Everett won easily, but Morton gained his largest support yet. Despite Everett's nominal endorsement, Morton succeeded in drawing away many anti-Masonic voters and consolidated nearly all of the Working Men's support, which had gone for Samuel Allen in the previous two elections. Morton's running mate, running with the explicit Anti-Masonic endorsement, outpolled him by another 5,000 votes.

1835 Massachusetts gubernatorial election
Party	Candidate	Votes	%	±%
Whig	Edward Everett	37,555	57.86%	▼0.19
Democratic	Marcus Morton	25,227	38.87%	▲14.08
Whig	Samuel T. Armstrong (incumbent)	1,901	2.93%	N/A
Write-in		220	0.34%	▲0.08
Total votes		64,903	100.00%	

== See also ==
- 1835 Massachusetts legislature
