= 1840 Massachusetts gubernatorial election =

- November 9, 1840
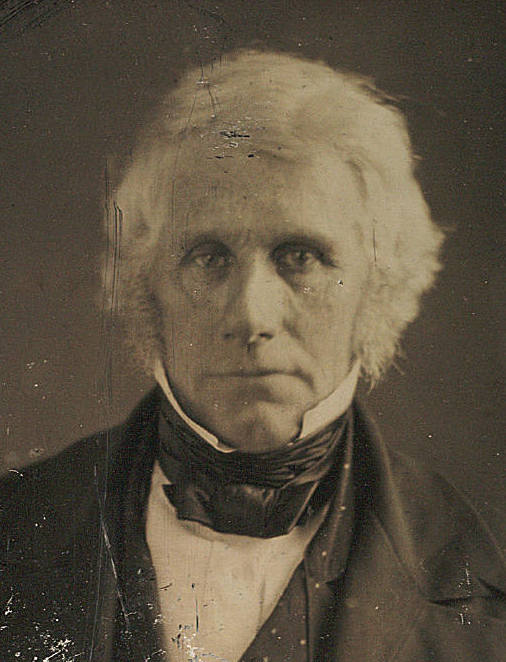

Nominee	John Davis	Marcus Morton
Party	Whig	Democratic
Popular vote	70,884	55,169
Percentage	55.68%	43.33%
- County results Davis: 50–60% 60–70% Morton: 50–60%
Governor before election
Marcus Morton
Democratic
Elected Governor
John Davis
Whig

The 1840 Massachusetts gubernatorial election was held on November 9.

Incumbent Democratic Governor Marcus Morton, who had won election by just one vote, stood for a second term in office. He was defeated by Whig U.S. Senator John Davis.

Morton out-ran President Martin Van Buren by about 2,000 votes in the state.

This was the first election in which the Liberty Party participated.

== Background ==
In 1839, Governor Marcus Morton won his first election in thirteen attempts by a single vote. However, he stood at the head of a hostile Whig government which obstructed his agenda. Morton was opposed to paper currency in favor of hard specie controlled by an Independent Treasury system, critical of the state's private banking system as a "monopoly," and supportive of a general corporation law, but Whigs controlling both houses of the General Court obstructed his agenda on every count.

Morton also proposed electoral reforms, including a secret ballot, an elimination of the property qualification for voting and holding office, and a reapportionment of the legislature according to population rather than assessed property value. All were rejected.

== General election ==
=== Candidates ===
- John Davis, U.S. senator since 1835 and former governor (1834–35) (Whig)
- Marcus Morton, incumbent governor (Democratic)
- George W. Robinson (Liberty)

Whig Senator Daniel Webster attempted to recruit former Governor Edward Everett to run again, but Everett preferred to travel Europe. U.S. Senator and former Governor John Davis ran instead.

=== Campaign ===
Democrats led by George Bancroft and Benjamin Hallett opened their campaign in April, as soon as Davis was announced as the Whig nominee. The Democrats accused Davis of hypocrisy in his claimed support for the "poor mechanic," given Davis's strong personal support for the Whigs' protective tariff policy, which Democrats claimed would cause "high prices for everything except labor." The Democratic campaign may have been hampered by the fact that Bancroft was Davis's brother-in-law.

Whigs ran a campaign focused on opposition to President Martin Van Buren, who was up for re-election, particularly over the issue of the Maine boundary dispute. One Whig, future U.S. Attorney General Caleb Cushing, even predicted that war with Great Britain was on the horizon. Whigs also campaigned against the proposal for an Independent Treasury system and in favor of their presidential candidate, the military hero William Henry Harrison. The Whig Boston Atlas attacked Bancroft and Hallet and accused the entire Democratic leadership of Locofocoism, while the more moderate Advertiser focused on promoting the Whig's national economic plan.

Whigs also attempted to attach the Morton campaign to the radical writings of Orestes A. Brownson, who had proposed an end to hereditary property inheritance, among other reforms. Democrats successfully distanced themselves from these proposals, but Morton did personally campaign in favor of a reduced ten-hour working day.

A September 10 rally by Whigs at Bunker Hill drew an estimated 50,000 supporters from as far as Mississippi. Senator Webster and Governors William Pennington of New Jersey and William W. Ellsworth of Connecticut, among others, spoke at the rally. Another Whig rally was held at Faneuil Hall on November 7, headed by Abbott Lawrence.

Late in the campaign on September 19, Bancroft launched an accusation that the Whigs were working with British capitalists, specifically the banking house Barings Brothers, to finance Harrison's campaign in exchange for the federal assumption of state debts. As support, Bancroft's Bay State Democrat cited the opinion of several London papers that Harrison's election would mean a return to a "sound and rational system." The Whigs dismissed the accusation out of hand.

The newly formed Liberty Party participated in the election, but was rejected by William Lloyd Garrison and other abolitionists as insufficiently resistant to slavery. Garrison's Liberator urged opposition to all three tickets.

=== Results ===
Although Morton increased his total vote, the Whig increase was so great that he lost by over 15,000 votes. The Liberty Party also received scattering votes throughout the state. 57 towns flipped from Morton to Davis, and the Democratic gains in 1839 in Whig counties largely evaporated.

1840 Massachusetts gubernatorial election
Party	Candidate	Votes	%	±%
Whig	John Davis	70,884	55.68%	▲5.98
Democratic	Marcus Morton (incumbent)	55,169	43.33%	▼6.67
Liberty	George W. Robinson	1,081	0.85%	N/A
Write-in		181	0.14%	▼0.16
Total votes		127,315	100.00%	

== See also ==
- 1840 Massachusetts legislature
