= 1839 Massachusetts gubernatorial election =

- November 11, 1839
- Turnout: 16.72% ▼1.33

Nominee	Marcus Morton	Edward Everett
Party	Democratic	Whig
Popular vote	51,034	50,725
Percentage	50.001%	49.70%
- County Results; Morton: 50–60% Everett: 50–60% 60–70%
Governor before election
Edward Everett
Whig
Elected Governor
Marcus Morton
Democratic

The 1839 Massachusetts gubernatorial election was held on November 11. Whig incumbent Edward Everett ran for a fifth term in office. In his thirteenth consecutive campaign for governor, Democratic judge Marcus Morton narrowly defeated Everett with a majority of just one vote.

Under Massachusetts law at the time, a majority of the votes cast was required to win, and Morton received exactly one more than half the votes cast. Despite the presence of some irregularities, incumbent Whig governor Edward Everett refused to contest the results once a legislative committee dominated by his party accepted a report giving Morton 51,034 votes out of 102,066 cast.

== Background ==
In the 19th century Massachusetts held annual elections for its statewide elected offices. A majority of the popular vote was required to win the election; if no candidate received a majority, the legislature would determine the winner. From 1825 to 1838, a succession of conservative National Republican and Whig governors were elected, at first by wide margins, and only later in the 1830s by narrower margins. The principal opponent of the Whigs was Democratic candidate Marcus Morton, who ran for governor each year from 1828 to 1843.

Abolitionism became a significant political force in Massachusetts in the mid-1830s. Although both Whig and Democratic politicians sought to avoid the issue in pursuit of other political objectives, activists forced attention on the issue, demanding that candidates for office answer questionnaires on the subject. Morton was known to be personally opposed to slavery, but he did not often let the matter affect his politics and expressed concern over abolitionist tactics. Governor Edward Everett, who once gave a speech expressing sympathy for the property rights of slaveholders and defended the plantation economy on which Massachusetts textile mills relied, was not seen as sympathetic to the abolitionist cause. In the elections of 1837 and 1838, abolitionist support increased Morton's vote counts, but he was never able to achieve the majority of votes needed to win election in the state.

== General election ==
=== Candidates ===
- Edward Everett, incumbent governor since 1836 (Whig)
- Marcus Morton, former acting governor and Democratic nominee for governor since 1828 (Democratic)

=== Campaign ===
In the 1838 term, Everett and the Whig legislature enacted reform legislation, including a bill barring imprisonment of debtors and a temperance bill that banned the sale of liquor in quantities less than 15 U.S. gallons (57 L). In addition to his legislative achievements, Everett campaigned on the state's rapid recovery from the financial crisis of 1837 and ending direct taxation. Everett emphasized the debtor bill's inclusion of mariners, who had been excluded from previously debtor protection laws. Everett also campaigned on his record of establishing and reforming state institutions, including a state lunatics' hospital, an improved penitentiary system, and a set-aside state education fund under the direction of Horace Mann.

Despite the fact that Morton was the first president of the American Temperance Society, Democrats (led by George Bancroft) argued the liquor law was discriminatory against Catholic immigrants and poor urbanites. Everett was also criticized for a bill requiring volunteer militias to pay the state an annual fee of $5; as a result, a "military ticket" was nominated in many parts of the state against Whigs. National politics, such as the independent treasury system issue, were largely left out of the opposition campaign.

=== Results ===
The election was held on Monday, November 11. Early returns gave Everett the lead, although his showing in Boston, historically a Whig stronghold, was particularly weak. On November 15, Morton was reported to take the lead lead by just two votes. A number of irregularities were identified during the initial count. The ballots from Easton had not been properly sealed by the town clerk, and the Winchendon return was dated 1809 instead of 1839. These votes were counted. A number of Whig officials (notably including adjutant general Henry Dearborn) did not vote, prompting Everett to observe, in response to their protestations that they supported his candidacy, "a better mode of showing [their support] would have been to vote."

The vote was so close that no result was certified until the legislature met on January 1, 1840. The new Whig-dominated legislature sent the election issue to a joint committee. One ballot for Morton contained the scrawl "Maccus Mattoon"; despite efforts by Whig partisans to deny the writer intended to vote for Morton, no person with that name was found anywhere in the state. A more serious issue was raised with respect to the Westfield returns: the town clerk had not properly sworn to the accuracy of the result, and Everett claimed that these results should be rejected.

On January 13, the joint committee issued its report, stating that 102,066 votes had been cast (including votes affected by the irregularities, which were accepted), and that therefore 51,034 votes were required to win. Morton was found to have received exactly that number, while Everett received 50,725, and a scattering of candidates received votes on the remaining 307 ballots cast.

Massachusetts gubernatorial election of 1839
Party	Candidate	Votes	%	±%
Democratic	Marcus Morton	51,034	50.001%	+5.51%
Whig	Edward Everett (incumbent)	50,725	49.70%	−5.27%
	Scattered votes	307	0.30%	−0.24%
Majority		309	0.30%	
Turnout		102,066	100.00%	
Democratic gain from Whig		Swing	+5.39%	

Morton's victory was driven by a large increase in turnout which exclusively favored Democrats rather than a defection from existing Whig voters. He won 169 towns and seven counties: Middlesex, Hampden, Berkshire, Norfolk, Bristol, and Dukes. Plymouth County narrowly flipped to Everett. Morton made his heaviest gains in Worcester, Middlesex, Essex, Suffolk, and Hampshire, while Everett gained in Hampden, Norfolk, Bristol, Plymouth, and Nantucket.

== Aftermath ==
Despite pressure from partisans to contest the official result, Everett declined. He recorded in his journal, "Principle is no longer sufficiently powerful even in Massachusetts to warrant an adherence to the strict provisions of the Constitution on a question of this kind." Everett also refused to let his friend and colleague Robert Winthrop publish a partisan tribute to him, writing, "I am willing to let the election go."

Morton was sworn in as governor on January 18, 1840. The legislature remained firmly Whig. Fifteen of the 28 senators who received a majority of the vote were Whigs, and Whig control of the House ensured that they would win the majority of disputed seats. The Senate also re-elected the Whig incumbent, George Hull, as lieutenant governor.

The Whig legislature refused to enact Morton's reformist agenda; in particular, it did not vote to repeal the 15-gallon law. The Whigs regrouped, and in 1840 Morton was defeated by John Davis. Morton won another single term in 1842, in a hotly contested election that was decided by the state legislature.

== See also ==
- 1839 Massachusetts legislature

== Sources ==
- Darling, Arthur (1925). Political Changes in Massachusetts, 1824–1848. New Haven, Connecticut: Yale University Press. OCLC 1593840.
- Earle, Jonathan (2000). "Marcus Morton and the Dilemma of Jacksonian Antislavery in Massachusetts, 1817–1849". Massachusetts Historical Review. 4: 60–87. JSTOR 25081171.
- Formisano, Ronald (1983). The Transformation of Political Culture: Massachusetts Parties, 1790s–1840s. New York: Oxford University Press. ISBN 9780195035094. OCLC 18429354.
- Frothingham, Paul Revere (1925). Edward Everett, Orator and Statesman. Boston: Houghton Mifflin Company. OCLC 1517736.
