= 1837 Massachusetts gubernatorial election =

- November 13, 1837

Nominee	Edward Everett	Marcus Morton
Party	Whig	Democratic
Popular vote	50,565	32,987
Percentage	60.31%	39.35%
- County results Everett: 50–60% 60–70% 70–80%
Governor before election
Edward Everett
Whig
Elected Governor
Edward Everett
Whig

The 1837 Massachusetts gubernatorial election was held on November 13.

Whig incumbent Edward Everett was re-elected to a third term in office, defeating perennial Democratic nominee Marcus Morton. The campaign was dominated by reaction to the ongoing financial crisis and the proposed system of a system of independent treasuries to manage the American money supply, which was highly unpopular in Massachusetts.

The national issue of slavery also played a major political role in the campaign for the first time in Massachusetts history. In response to the 1836 declaration of an independent Texas and proposals for American annexation, Unitarian minister William Ellery Channing and Democratic campaigners criticized Everett, a pro-business Whig, for his support of the plantation economy.

== General election ==
=== Candidates ===
- Edward Everett, incumbent governor since 1836 (Whig)
- Marcus Morton, associate justice of the Massachusetts Supreme Judicial Court, former acting governor and nominee since 1828 (Democratic)

=== Campaign ===
The campaign was dominated by the Panic of 1837, which was blamed on Martin Van Buren. Van Buren's call for a system of independent treasuries to manage the American money supply was unpopular in the state and rapidly erased political gains made by the Democratic Party in Massachusetts during the presidency of Andrew Jackson. Francis Baylies and Richard Fletcher also took active part in the Whig campaign, attacking Jackson and Van Buren for causing the panic through their political struggle against national banking.

Morton declined to take any active role in the campaign. Nonetheless, the Boston Atlas, the primary Whig newspaper and campaign vehicle, assailed him as a "political" judge and called for his impeachment and removal from the bench. Democrats countered the Whig campaign by linking Boston banking interests and Everett to Freemasonry, which had been a major political issue during the Jackson presidency.

On November 11, Whigs held a rally at Faneuil Hall with national leaders including Daniel Webster, John Bell, William J. Graves, Joseph R. Underwood and Ogden Hoffman.

For the first time in Massachusetts history, the state's connection to the plantation economy and slavery were a major issue. Late in the campaign, William Ellery Channing joined the anti-slavery cause with an epistle against Texan independence, arguing that it was a theft of Mexican territory, an extension of the slave system, and risked angering Great Britain by threatening its position in the Caribbean. Channing appealed to Henry Clay and Everett to abandon the Whigs' pro-business orientation and toleration of the plantation system. Morton, by contrast, was among the most anti-slavery members of the Democratic Party. Benjamin F. Hallett of the Advocate soon thereafter published a review contrasting Everett's 1826 declaration in favor of the slave system and to Morton's 1827 declaration in opposition to slavery.

=== Results ===
1837 Massachusetts gubernatorial election
Party	Candidate	Votes	%	±%
Whig	Edward Everett (incumbent)	50,565	60.31%	▲6.53
Democratic	Marcus Morton	32,987	39.35%	▼6.57
Write-in		286	0.34%	▲0.04
Total votes		83,838	100.00%	

== See also ==
- 1837 Massachusetts legislature
