= November 1831 Massachusetts gubernatorial election =

- November 14, 1831
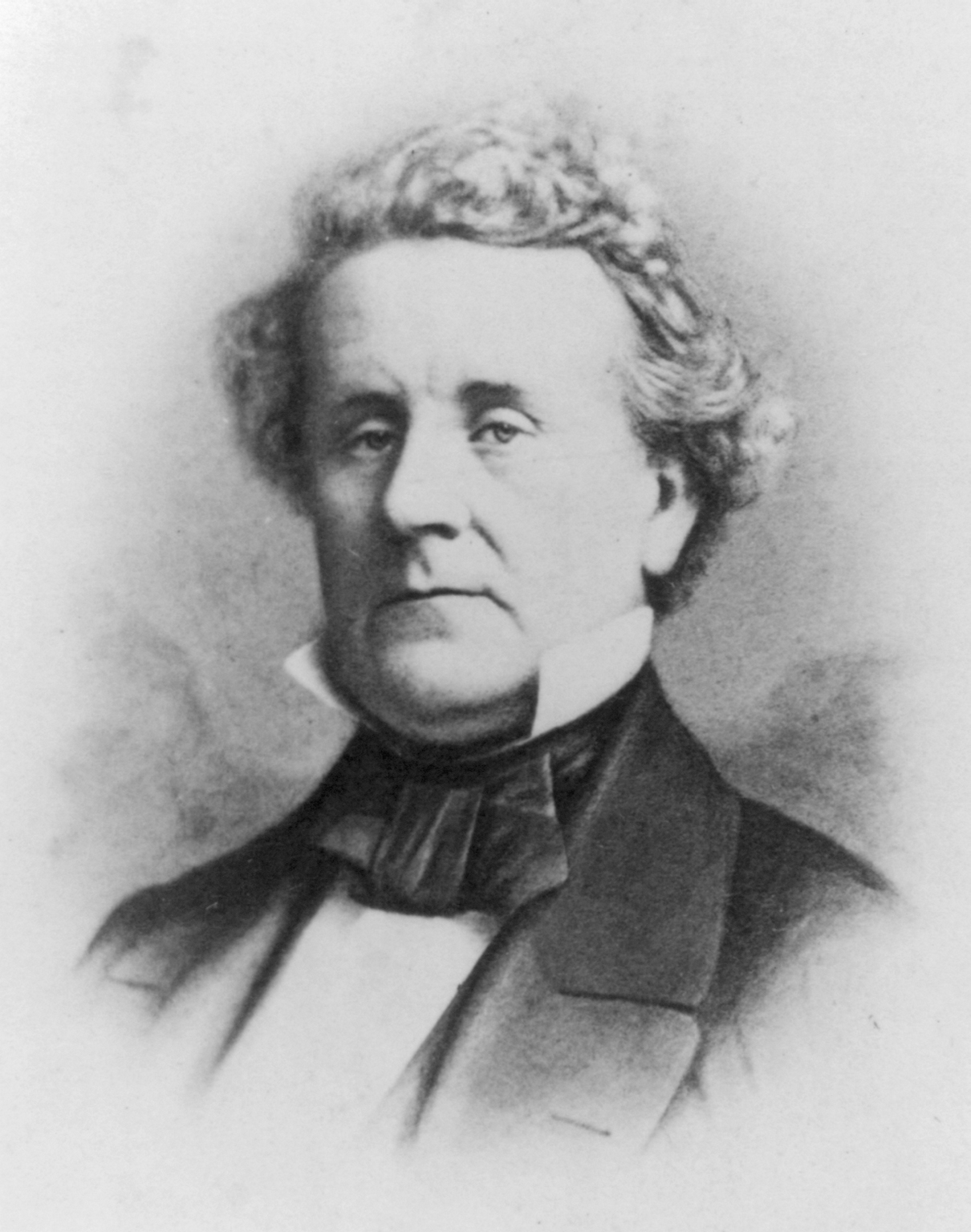

| Nominee | Levi Lincoln Jr. | Samuel Lathrop | Marcus Morton |
| Party | National Republican | Anti-Masonic | Democratic |
| Popular vote | 28,804 | 13,357 | 10,975 |
| Percentage | 53.93% | 25.01% | 20.55% |
- County results Lincoln: 40–50% 50–60% 60–70% 70–80% 80–90% Lathrop: 40–50% 50–60% Morton: 50–60%
Governor before election
Levi Lincoln Jr.
National Republican
Elected Governor
Levi Lincoln Jr.
National Republican

The second 1831 Massachusetts gubernatorial election was held on November 14.

National Republican Governor Levi Lincoln Jr. was re-elected to an eighth term in office over Democrat Marcus Morton and Anti-Mason Samuel Lathrop. This was the first regular Massachusetts election scheduled for November after the schedule changed from April.

This was also the first election featuring the organized involvement of the Anti-Masonic Party.

== General election ==
=== Candidates ===
- Samuel Lathrop, former U.S. representative and state senator from West Springfield (Anti-Masonic)
- Levi Lincoln Jr., incumbent governor since 1825 (National Republican)
- Marcus Morton, associate justice of the Supreme Judicial Court, former acting governor and nominee since 1828 (Democratic)

=== Campaign ===
After John Quincy Adams declined their nomination, the Anti-Masons announced their support for Samuel Lathrop, an Adams supporter and former Federalist nominee for governor. Their campaign was largely conducted by Benjamin F. Hallett through his journal the Boston Free Press and Advocate.

On the Democratic side, Marcus Morton made no active opposition to Lathrop's candidacy, and the leading Jacksonian journal, the Statesman, folded in August. Charles G. Greene of the Statesman started a new small paper, the Morning Post, to replace it. Statesman owner and collector of the Port of Boston David Henshaw remained in control of the Massachusetts Jacksonians, and the Morning Post continued to advocate against the Bank of the United States and in favor of anti-masonry, temperance, and the abolition of slavery. The change in name may have been necessitated by the Statesman's association with John C. Calhoun, who broke fully with the Jackson administration.

The National Republicans primarily campaigned on Lincoln's record as governor.

=== Results ===
Lincoln again won a safe majority, albeit his smallest by far.

Turnout increased, likely due to the Anti-Masonic fervor, which made large gains among the rural eastern towns and carried Franklin and Hampshire counties. The result was a transition of rural National Republicans and old Federalists to Anti-Masonry.

The new Democrats, failing to make Masonry a political issue, lost support to the Anti-Masons.

November 1831 Massachusetts gubernatorial election
| Party | Candidate | Votes | % | ±% |
|---|---|---|---|---|
| National Republican | Levi Lincoln Jr. (incumbent) | 28,804 | 53.93% | ▼11.26 |
| Anti-Masonic | Samuel Lathrop | 13,357 | 25.01% | ▲22.74 |
| Democratic | Marcus Morton | 10,975 | 20.55% | ▼5.41 |
| Write-in | | 279 | 0.52% | ▼3.82 |
| Total votes | | 53,415 | 100.00% | |

== See also ==
- 1831 Massachusetts legislature
