= 1833–34 Massachusetts gubernatorial election =

- November 11, 1833 (popular vote); January 9, 1834 (House votes); January 10, 1834 (Senate vote)
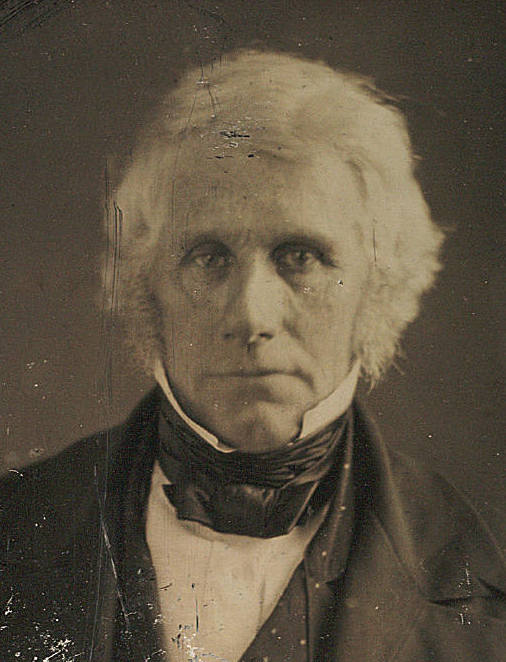

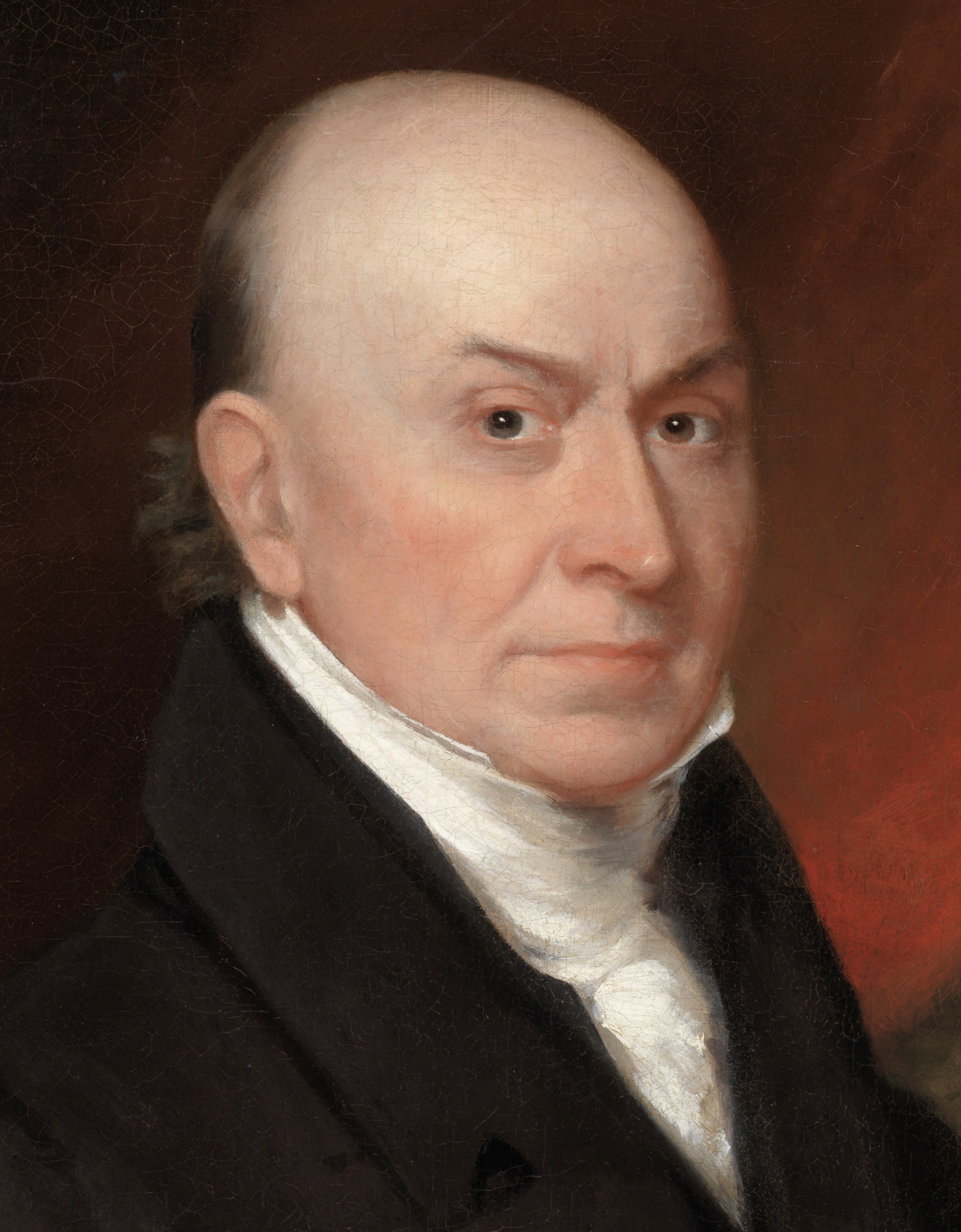

Nominee	John Davis	Marcus Morton
Party	National Republican	Democratic
Popular vote	25,149	15,493
Percentage	40.26%	24.80%
House vote 1	327 (59.78%)	199 (36.38%)
House vote 2	Moved on	267 (74.79%)
Senate vote	30 (81.08%)	4 (10.81%)
Nominee	John Quincy Adams	Samuel C. Allen
Party	Anti-Masonic	Working Men's
Popular vote	18,274	3,459
Percentage	29.25%	5.54%
House vote 1	18 (3.29%)	3 (0.55%)
House vote 2	26 (7.28%)	64 (17.93%)
Senate vote	Eliminated	Eliminated
- County results Davis: 30–40% 40–50% 50–60% Adams: 30–40% 40–50% 50–60% Morton: 40–50%
Governor before election
Levi Lincoln Jr.
National Republican
Elected Governor
John Davis
National Republican

The 1833–34 Massachusetts gubernatorial election consisted of a popular election (direct election) held on November 11, 1833, and a legislative vote held in January 1834. The task of electing the governor fell to the Massachusetts General Court because no candidate received the constitutionally required majority of the popular vote.

National Republican Governor Levi Lincoln Jr. did not run for a tenth term in office. Elected to succeed him was John Davis, a National Republican. Davis defeated former United States president John Quincy Adams, Democrat Marcus Morton, and Working Men's candidate Samuel Allen.

== Nominations ==
=== Anti-Masonic ===
In March, Representative Edward Everett approached John Quincy Adams to inform him that Governor Levi Lincoln Jr. would not seek a tenth term in office and that a union of the National Republican Party and Anti-Masonic Party could be effected to ensure Adams's election.

A group of Anti-Masons traveled to Washington to appeal to Adams in July but found him reluctant to accept their nomination without guarantee of a National Republican alliance. They gave him the assurance that National Republicans would unite with them in his nomination as they had in support of Senator Daniel Webster. He remained skeptical, aware that many conservatives and Masons within the state National Republican Party were opposed to his candidacy.

Because of his reluctance, Adams suggested Edward Everett himself seek the endorsement, but when he attempted to gain Anti-Masonic support with a speech denouncing Masonic influence, he was informed he could no longer secure the National Republican endorsement and declined to seek either party's nomination. Given Everett's withdrawal and Samuel Lathrop's refusal to run as the party's nominee for a third time, Adams resolved to accept, expecting that he would also receive the National Republican endorsement. He was formally endorsed at the Anti-Masonic convention in September.

=== National Republican ===
However, the Everett brothers approached Adams once more to ask him to withdraw in favor of John Davis at the behest of George Bancroft, Davis's brother-in-law. Adams faced an uphill battle for the National Republican nomination; 35 of the 63 delegates from Boston were influential Masons.

Davis, a moderate critic of Masonry, was nonetheless reluctant to accept the National Republican nomination. He did so only at the urging of Governor Lincoln, and was nominated at the National Republican convention in October.

=== Democratic ===
The Democrats largely avoided the conflict over Masonry and perennial nominee Marcus Morton publicly declared that he would not join the Anti-Masonic movement nor publicly discuss Freemasonry.

In June, the party was buoyed by the personal presence of President Andrew Jackson in the state, which he toured with Josiah Quincy as his aide-de-camp en route to Harvard to accept an honorary doctorate of letters. Jackson's tour drew large crowds of supporters and caused at least one National Republican publication, the Boston Courier, to remark that as president, Jackson deserved the honor.

At the party convention in September, Morton was nominated again without opposition, though the convention's resolutions against John C. Calhoun and nullification may have caused a stir and the beginnings of a rift between the conservative urban faction led by David Henshaw, who was friendly with Calhoun, and the liberal rural faction led by Morton.

=== Working Men's ===
The Working Men's Party was formed in a separate convention held in Boston on October 2. Samuel Allen, a graduate of Dartmouth and Congregationalist minister, was selected as the new party's nominee. He declared that the party was on the side of "producers" against "accumulators" and those who controlled "associated wealth."

== General election ==
=== Candidates ===
- John Quincy Adams, U.S. representative from Quincy and former President of the United States (Anti-Masonic)
- Samuel Allen, Congregationalist minister from Northfield (Working Men's)
- John Davis, U.S. representative from Worcester, Massachusetts (National Republican)
- Marcus Morton, associate justice of the Supreme Judicial Court, former acting governor and nominee since 1828 (Democratic)

=== Campaign ===
A major issue in the campaign was President Jackson's cancellation of government deposits in the U.S. Bank in September, outraging conservative supporters of the Bank. Democrats continued to remain silent on Masonry throughout the election, and focused on absorbing the Allen's supporters by declaring his principles as identical to those of Jackson.

The last days of the campaign were particularly intense as National Republicans bitterly attacked Adams and Morton. The Morning Post published a report on the eve of the election claiming that Morton was the preferred candidate of National Republican leaders, suggesting that both Davis and Adams lacked support from the party leadership. With the Democrats focused on the Working Men and Adams appeal to individual National Republicans, the Anti-Mason's felt their chances of winning were strong.

=== Results ===
Though Davis won a plurality of the vote, he did not secure a majority necessary to secure his election. Adams made large gains for the Anti-Masons in the eastern part of the state, chiefly at the expense of the National Republicans. The conservative National Republicans had lost more than a quarter of their votes to the three liberal parties.

Allen drew support from Democrats and rural National Republicans; his support was preponderantly rural.

Morton carried Dukes and Essex counties because Adams took enough National Republican votes to leave Democratic pluralities, but did increase his vote overall despite Allen's presence in the race.

1833 Massachusetts gubernatorial election
Party	Candidate	Votes	%	±%
National Republican	John Davis	25,149	40.26%	▼12.75
Anti-Masonic	John Quincy Adams	18,274	29.25%	▲6.17
Democratic	Marcus Morton	15,493	24.80%	▲1.05
Working Men's	Samuel Allen	3,459	5.54%	N/A
Write-in		99	0.16%	▲0.01
Total votes		62,474	100.00%	

== Legislative vote ==
Because no candidate secured a majority, the election was decided by the General Court. The newly formed 1834 Massachusetts House of Representatives would choose two candidates and the Senate would select one as governor.

Negotiations ensued between the Anti-Masons and Democrats in the House to present Morton and Adams; Morton would then be elected by the Senate on the ground that he was more friendly to the Anti-Masons than Davis.

On November 26, Edward Everett visited Adams to prevail upon him to withdraw and endorse Davis. Despite some private resistance, Adams eventually did so, possibly out of fear that Morton's election would be seen as a victory for President Jackson or possibly from reluctance to leave his district without a Representative in Congress.

Davis was elected by an alliance of National Republicans and Anti-Masons, who went on to form the bulk of the new Whig Party, though not without shedding some dissenters.

Adams endorsed an amendment to the state constitution which would abandon the majority requirement; this amendment would not come until May 1855.

House Ballot 1
Party	Candidate	Votes	%
National Republican	Davis	327	59.78
Democratic	Morton	199	36.38
Anti-Masonic	Adams	18	3.29
Working Men's	Allen	3	0.55
Valid votes		547	98.38
Blank votes		9	1.62
Total		556	100

House Ballot 2
Party	Candidate	Votes	%
Democratic	Morton	267	74.79
Working Men's	Allen	64	17.93
Anti-Masonic	Adams	26	7.28
Valid votes		357	100
Total		357	100

Senate Ballot
Party	Candidate	Votes	%
National Republican	Davis	30	81.08
Democratic	Morton	4	10.81
Blank		3	8.11
Valid votes		37	100
Total		37	100

== See also ==
- 1833 Massachusetts legislature
