= 1838 Massachusetts gubernatorial election =

- November 12, 1838

Nominee	Edward Everett	Marcus Morton
Party	Whig	Democratic
Popular vote	51,642	41,795
Percentage	54.97%	44.49%
- County results Everett: 50–60% 60–70% Morton: 50–60%
Governor before election
Edward Everett
Whig
Elected Governor
Edward Everett
Whig

The 1838 Massachusetts gubernatorial election was held on November 12.

Incumbent Whig Governor Edward Everett was re-elected to a fourth term in office, defeating Democrat Marcus Morton.

== General election ==
=== Candidates ===
- Edward Everett, incumbent governor since 1836 (Whig)
- Marcus Morton, former acting governor and nominee since 1828 (Democratic)

The newly formed temperance movement considered putting a candidate into the race but was satisfied that Everett had linked himself to their movement through his support and signature of a strict temperance law.

=== Campaign ===
The Whigs presented a united front in opposition to "Van Burenism." Alongside Governor Everett, the campaign was led by Senator Daniel Webster, who Whigs identified as the key Washington opponent to Van Buren. Behind the scenes, however, there was a growing divide between supporters of William Henry Harrison for president in 1840, including Webster, and those who supported Henry Clay, like Abbott Lawrence.

As it had in 1837, the Whig Atlas assailed Morton as an "office-seeking" judge who was "false to the spirit of the Constitution." The Atlas once more called for his impeachment, arguing that he was "annually tucking up his Judicial robes for a bout at political fisticuffs" and could not rule impartially. The journal also attacked new Collector of Boston George Bancroft and Benjamin F. Hallett as exercising "imperial control over the total Loco Focoism of the state."

The Democratic campaign was led by Bancroft, who focused the effort on a radical declaration of financial principles. He attempted to recruit John Quincy Adams to the campaign, arguing that as a national bank was now out of the question, "old Federalists and Whigs" should join with Democrats against the state banking system. Adams did not respond.

The Democrats once again pressed the issue of anti-Masonry, arguing that no member of the soon-defunct Anti-Masonic Party could join with the Whigs in support of the "overbearing despotism of Nicholas Biddle's Bank when... Antimasonry 'plumed itself on equal rights and free privileges among all,' and uniformly denounced corporate dictation or supremacy."

During the campaign, future U.S. Senator Isaac C. Bates allegedly led a gang of Northampton Whigs in serial assaults against Mr. Munn, a local Democratic newspaper editor. Whig "disorganizers" were also alleged in Gloucester, where Robert Rantoul Jr. claimed that fisherman returning from months at sea for the election were misinformed that Joseph S. Cabot was the Democratic nominee for Congress, causing a large number of votes erroneously cast in his name.

=== Results ===
Everett defeated Morton for the fourth consecutive year, but the margin narrowed from its peak in 1837. The overall turnout reached a record of 93,941, with nearly all of the gains going to Morton. The result may have been attributable to Massachusetts's rapid recovery from the Panic of 1837, which was the major theme of the Whig campaign against Van Buren.

1838 Massachusetts gubernatorial election
Party	Candidate	Votes	%	±%
Whig	Edward Everett (incumbent)	51,642	54.97%	▼5.34
Democratic	Marcus Morton	41,795	44.49%	▲5.14
Write-in		504	0.54%	▲0.20
Total votes		93,941	100.00%	

== See also ==
- 1838 Massachusetts legislature
