= 1836 Massachusetts gubernatorial election =

- November 14, 1836

| Nominee | Edward Everett | Marcus Morton |
| Party | Whig | Democratic |
| Alliance | | Anti-Masonic |
| Popular vote | 42,160 | 35,992 |
| Percentage | 53.78% | 45.92% |
- County results Everett: 50–60% 60–70% 70–80% Morton: 50–60% 60–70%
Governor before election
Edward Everett
Whig
Elected Governor
Edward Everett
Whig

The 1836 Massachusetts gubernatorial election was held on November 14.

Incumbent Whig Governor Edward Everett was re-elected to a second term in office, defeating Democrat Marcus Morton.

== Nominations ==
=== Anti-Masonic ===
The Anti-Masonic Party met in convention under the leadership of Benjamin F. Hallett on January 29 and nominated Marcus Morton and endorsed Martin Van Buren for President.

However, Franklin County Anti-Masons rejected the Van Buren endorsement. A dissident faction of Anti-Masons met on March 9 and endorsed Daniel Webster for president. Each faction accused the other of insufficient devotion to the cause of anti-Masonry.

=== Democratic ===
The Democratic Party had divided between supporters of party boss David Henshaw and perennial nominee Marcus Morton. The division began over the choice for a new Collector of the Port of Boston after Henshaw stepped down. Henshaw, a member of the more conservative faction aligned with John C. Calhoun, preferred his close ally J.K. Simpson. had lost control of the party to moderate supporters of presumptive presidential nominee Martin Van Buren. Morton, a close ally of Van Buren, advised the appointment of an outsider.

Nevertheless, Henshaw, recognizing his minority status within the party he had helped found and the need for unity in a presidential election year, got behind Morton for a tenth consecutive nomination.

== General election ==
=== Candidates ===
- Edward Everett, incumbent governor since 1836 (Whig)
- Marcus Morton, former acting governor and nominee since 1828 (Democratic)

=== Campaign ===
The Democratic campaign embraced a populist message premised on opposition to the Second Bank of the United States, monopoly power, and Harvard College. David Henshaw called for the popular election of judges and elimination of corporate monopolies.

Whigs focused their energy on the presidential campaign, where they supported Daniel Webster and Francis Granger, and the House of Representatives campaign. Governor Everett's brother Alexander did abandon the party to become a Democratic candidate for Congress in Norfolk County. Alexander and George Bancroft, running in the Hampden County district, bore the brunt of Whig criticism.

=== Results ===
With increased turnout due to the presidential race, most of the gains went to Morton. Democrats gained a seat in Congress, with William Parmenter unseating Samuel Hoar in Middlesex County. The lone Democratic incumbent, Nathaniel B. Borden of Bristol County, was re-elected.

Morton remarked privately to president-elect Van Buren that the Massachusetts Democratic Party was in excellent position to win, should the Whigs make a single mistake.

1836 Massachusetts gubernatorial election
| Party | Candidate | Votes | % | ±% |
|---|---|---|---|---|
| Whig | Edward Everett (incumbent) | 42,160 | 53.78% | ▼4.08 |
| Democratic | Marcus Morton | 35,992 | 45.92% | ▲7.05 |
| Write-in | | 237 | 0.30% | ▼0.04 |
| Total votes | | 78,389 | 100.00% | |

== See also ==
- 1836 Massachusetts legislature
