= George Lunt =

American editor, lawyer, author, and politician

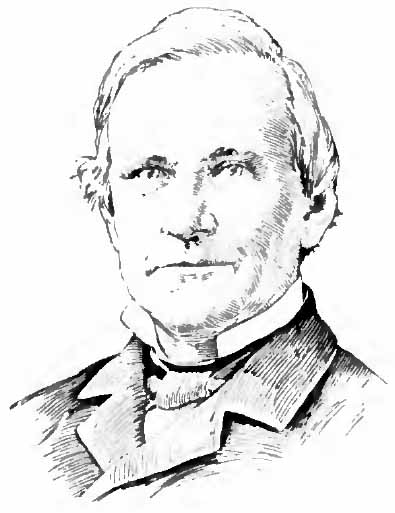

United States Attorney for the District of Massachusetts
- In office 1849–1853
- Preceded by: Robert Rantoul Jr.
- Succeeded by: Benjamin F. Hallett

Member of the Massachusetts Senate

Member of the Massachusetts House of Representatives

Personal details
- Born: December 31, 1803 Newburyport, Massachusetts, U.S.
- Died: May 17, 1885 (aged 81) Boston, Massachusetts, U.S.
- Party: Whig (until 1856); Democratic (after 1856)
- Education: Phillips Exeter Academy
- Alma mater: Harvard College
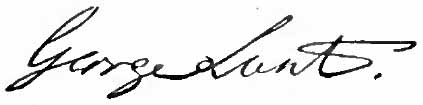
- Signature

George Lunt (December 31, 1803 – May 17, 1885) was an American editor, lawyer, writer, and politician. George's ancestor, Henry Lunt, was one of the original settlers of Newbury (1635). His grandfather's exploits with John Paul Jones were chronicled by James Fenimore Cooper.

== Life ==
George Lunt was born in Newburyport, Massachusetts on December 31, 1803. He attended Phillips Exeter Academy. He was graduated at Harvard College in 1824, with special distinction in Greek, studied law, and began practice in Newburyport in 1827.

In earlier life, Lunt was an active member of the Whig party, and in its interests was distinguished as a public speaker. On the dissolution of that party he became a Democrat. He was elected successively representative for Newburyport and senator from Essex County in the legislature, was an active member of the convention that nominated General Zachary Taylor for the presidency, and was appointed United States District Attorney for Massachusetts under Taylor's administration. He eventually resumed the private practice of his profession, devoting his leisure to literary pursuits. When the Whigs dissolved, he joined the Democrats.

Prior to and during the Civil War he was editor of the Boston Courier in conjunction with George S. Hillard. He opposed policies which would estrange the South and defended slavery. When he returned to the practice of his profession, he appeared frequently in the state courts, and was counsel before congressional committees in reference to French claims, preparing a bill and efficiently pressing it for the action of congress. Mr. Lunt's later years were marked by labors in behalf of harbors of refuge, notably at Scituate, Massachusetts, on the south shore of Boston bay. By persevering effort he succeeded in securing very considerable appropriations from congress to this end. He was a man of firm convictions in both political and religious matters, and fearless and manly in their expression. As a writer his style was marked by strength, dignity, and grace.

Lunt died in Boston on May 17, 1885.

== Works ==
- "Poems" (New York, 1839)
- The Age of Gold (Boston, 1843)
- The Dove and the Eagle (1851)
- Lyric Poems (1854)
- Julia (1855)
- Eastford, or Household Sketches (1855)
- Lunt, George (1857). Three Eras of New England. Ticknor and Fields. "George Lunt."
- "Radicalism in Religion, Philosophy, and Social Life" (1858)
- The Union, a Poem (1860)
- Lunt, George (1863). Review of McClellan's campaigns: as commander of the Army of the Potomac. Press of the Daily courier. "George Lunt."
- Origin of the Late War (New York, 1866)
- Old New England Traits. Hurd and Houghton. 1873. "George Lunt."
- Poems (1884).

== Notes ==
Legal offices
Preceded by Robert Rantoul, Jr.	United States Attorney for the District of Massachusetts; 1850–1853	Succeeded by Benjamin F. Hallett
