= Henry H. Childs =

American politician

16th Lieutenant Governor of Massachusetts
- In office January 17, 1843 – January 9, 1844
- Governor: Marcus Morton
- Preceded by: George Hull
- Succeeded by: John Reed Jr.

Personal details
- Born: June 7, 1783 Pittsfield, Massachusetts, U.S.
- Died: March 22, 1868 (aged 84) Boston, Massachusetts, U.S.
- Party: Democratic
- Education: Williams College

Henry Halsey Childs (June 7, 1783 – March 22, 1868) was an American politician and medical doctor from Massachusetts, who served as the 16th lieutenant governor of Massachusetts in 1843. He was a native of Pittsfield, Massachusetts and graduated from Williams College in 1802.

== Life ==
Henry Childs was born in Pittsfield, Massachusetts to Timothy and Rachel (Wells Easton) Childs. His father was a prominent local physician and a political and militia leader during the American Revolution. Childs trained with his father, eventually joining and then taking over his practice. He was responsible for the introduction of smallpox vaccination to the area, against significant local opposition. He entered Williams College at fifteen, and graduated with distinction in 1802. One of his first major political activities was lobbying the state for a charter to establish a medical school in Pittsfield, which was granted in 1823. The school, initially organized under the Williams College umbrella, became Berkshire Medical College. He was active in its early organizational years, and served as its president from 1837, the year of its separation from Williams, until 1863.

Childs, who was politically a Democratic-Republican and then Democratic, was elected to single terms of the state legislature in 1816 and 1827, and served as a representative to the state's 1820-21 constitutional convention. At the convention he was a vocal advocate of the separation of church and state. In 1837 he was elected to a single term in the state senate, and in 1834 he was elected lieutenant governor, serving under Democrat Marcus Morton.

Childs married Sarah Clapp; the couple had four children, one of whom died as an infant.

Political offices
Preceded by George Hull	Lieutenant Governor of Massachusetts; 1843 – 1844	Succeeded by John Reed Jr.
