= Marcus Morton =

American jurist and politician

- Portrait miniature, c. 1827–1835

16th & 18th Governor of Massachusetts
- In office January 17, 1843 – January 9, 1844
- Lieutenant: Henry H. Childs
- Preceded by: John Davis
- Succeeded by: George N. Briggs
- In office January 18, 1840 – January 7, 1841
- Lieutenant: George Hull
- Preceded by: Edward Everett
- Succeeded by: John Davis
- In office Acting: February 6, 1825 – May 26, 1825
- Preceded by: William Eustis
- Succeeded by: Levi Lincoln Jr.

12th Lieutenant Governor of Massachusetts
- In office May 31, 1824 – May 26, 1825
- Governor: William Eustis (1824–1825); Himself (1825)
- Preceded by: Levi Lincoln Jr.
- Succeeded by: Thomas L. Winthrop

Associate Justice of the Massachusetts Supreme Judicial Court
- In office 1825–1840
- Appointed by: Levi Lincoln Jr.
- Preceded by: Levi Lincoln Jr.
- Succeeded by: Theron Metcalf (1848)

Member of the U.S. House of Representatives from Massachusetts's 10th district
- In office March 4, 1817 – March 3, 1821
- Preceded by: Laban Wheaton
- Succeeded by: Francis Baylies

Personal details
- Born: December 19, 1784 East Freetown, Massachusetts
- Died: February 6, 1864 (aged 79) Taunton, Massachusetts
- Party: Democratic-Republican; Democratic; Free Soil
- Spouse: Charlotte Morton née Hodges
- Children: Marcus Morton; Nathaniel Morton; Lydia Mason Lee née Morton; Charlotte Watson née Morton; Frances Wood French née Morton
- Education: Brown University
- Profession: Lawyer

Marcus Morton (December 19, 1784 – February 6, 1864) was an American lawyer, jurist, and politician from Taunton, Massachusetts. He served two terms as the governor of Massachusetts and several months as Acting Governor following the death in 1825 of William Eustis. He served for 15 years as an associate justice of the Massachusetts Supreme Judicial Court, all the while running unsuccessfully as a Democrat for governor. He finally won the 1839 election, acquiring exactly the number of votes required for a majority win over Edward Everett. After losing the 1840 and 1841 elections, he was elected in a narrow victory in 1842.

The Massachusetts Democratic Party was highly factionalized, which contributed to Morton's long string of defeats. His brief periods of ascendancy, however, resulted in no substantive Democratic-supported reforms, since the dominant Whigs reversed most of the changes enacted during his terms. An opponent of the extension of slavery, he split with longtime friend John C. Calhoun over that issue, and eventually left the party for the Free Soil movement. He was considered by Martin Van Buren as a potential vice presidential running mate in 1848.

== Early years ==
Morton was born in East Freetown, Massachusetts in 1784, the only son of Nathaniel and Mary (Cary) Morton. Sources report his day of birth to be either February 19 or December 19. Morton's gravestone uses the February 19 date. His father was a farmer who was politically active, serving for a time on the Governor's Council. Morton received his early education at home, and was placed at age fourteen in the academy of Reverend Calvin Chaddock at Rochester, Massachusetts.

In 1801 Morton was admitted to Brown University with the sophomore class, and graduated in 1804. During his time at Brown he came to adopt Jeffersonian ideas, making an outspoken anti-Federalist speech at his commencement. He then read law at Taunton for a year in the office of Judge Seth Padelford, after which he entered Tapping Reeve's law school in Litchfield, Connecticut. There he was a schoolmate of John C. Calhoun, who served as a mentor and friend for many years. Moving back to Taunton, he was admitted to the Norfolk County bar in 1807 and opened a practice. In December of that year he married Charlotte Hodges, with whom he had twelve children. He later received honorary law degrees from Brown (1826), and Harvard (1840).

== Entry into politics ==
Morton honed his partisan skills in Taunton, frequently speaking out against Federalism, which dominated Massachusetts politics. In 1808 Governor James Sullivan offered him the post of district attorney for Bristol County, but he demurred because the office was still held by his teacher, Judge Padelford. He did, however, accept the post when it was offered to him in 1811 by Elbridge Gerry.

Morton was nominated by the Democratic-Republicans to run for Congress in 1814, but lost by a wide margin to Laban Wheaton in what was then seen as a strongly Federalist district. Two years later he was, to some surprise, victorious in a rematch with Wheaton despite Federalist strength in other races. Morton was reelected in 1818, but narrowly lost to Francis Baylies in 1820. In Congress he supported Andrew Jackson, whose actions in the Seminole Wars were being scrutinized, and opposed the Missouri Compromise. Morton was personally opposed to slavery, but did not often let it inform his political decisions until later in life; he preferred instead to focus his efforts on other priorities. Despite this, his written statements on slavery were to become a matter of contentious debate when party factions within the Democratic Party sought to use them against him in the 1840s. In these early years he was also a proponent of free trade; like many Massachusetts politicians, he later adopted a strong protectionist stance, calling the early period "the lamest ... of my life".

== Supreme Judicial Court and runs for governor ==
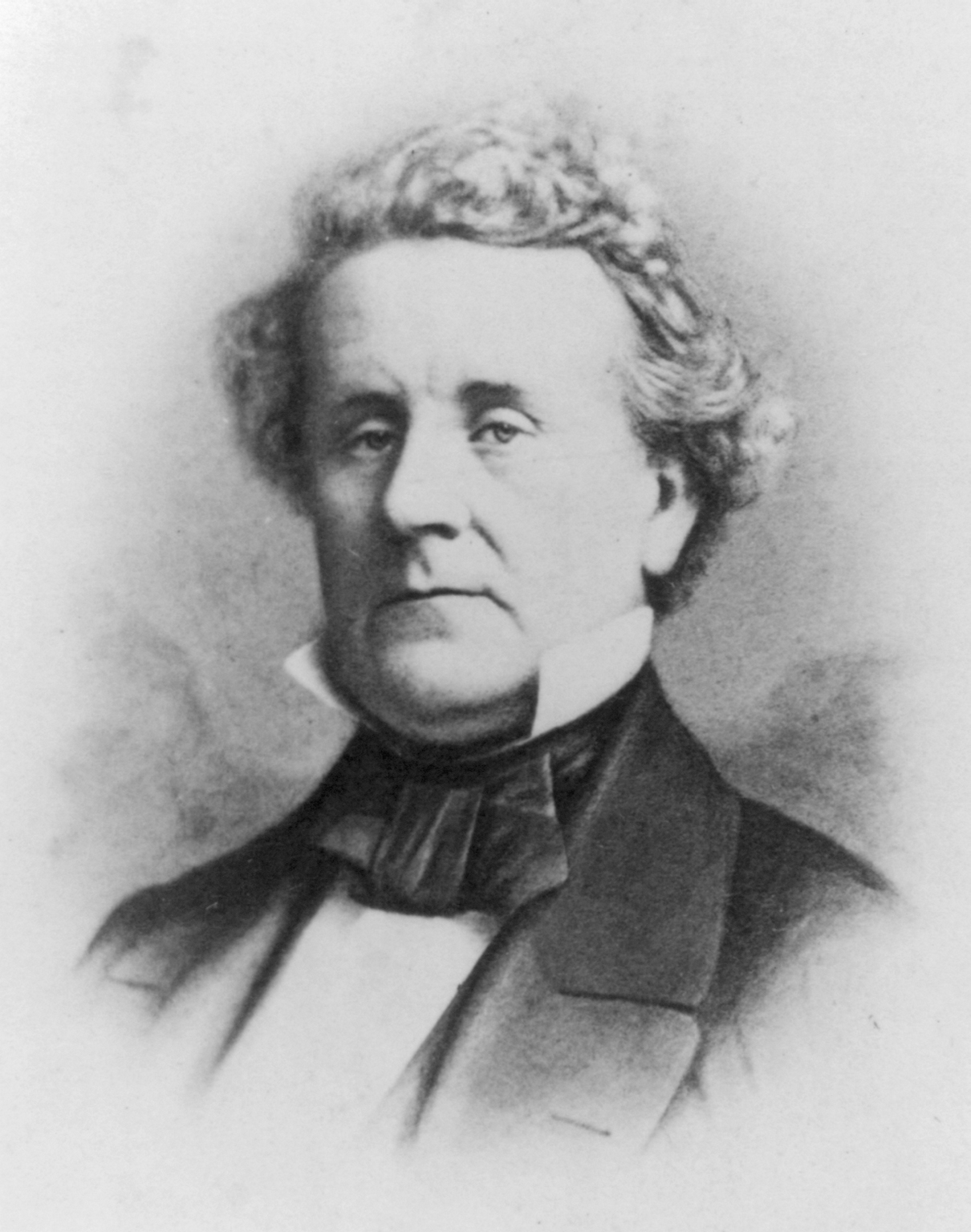
Levi Lincoln Jr., who appointed Morton to the Massachusetts Supreme Judicial Court but soon after became a political opponent

In 1823 Morton was elected to the Massachusetts Governor's Council, and the following year was elected Lieutenant Governor, serving under Republican Governor William Eustis. When Eustis died in office in February 1825, Morton served as acting governor until the election a few months later. Since the 1824 election had virtually eliminated the Federalist Party as a force in the state, Federalists and wealthy Republicans were coalescing into what became known as the National Republican Party (predecessor to the Whigs). Morton disagreed with this trend (calling the National Republicans "aristocratic"), preferring Jacksonian-style Democracy instead, and refused to stand for election as governor in 1825. He was, however, prevailed to run again for lieutenant governor, and he won the post, serving under Levi Lincoln Jr., who had been nominated by both the Republicans and a rump Federalist coalition. Morton was unhappy with what he termed Whig elitism (he accused Lincoln in 1830 of being a "tool of monied aristocracy"), and resigned the lieutenant governorship. Lincoln promptly appointed Morton as an associate justice of the Massachusetts Supreme Judicial Court (SJC), a post he would hold until 1840.

=== Jurisprudence ===
Morton was the only Democrat on the SJC, all the other justices having been appointed by Federalists. Despite this, Morton wrote a few notable decisions. He wrote the court's decision in Charles River Bridge v. Warren Bridge, a case that eventually went to the United States Supreme Court. The plaintiffs were proprietors of the Charles River Bridge, a toll bridge constructed between Boston and Charlestown in 1786, and the defendants were proprietors of a competing bridge to which the state had issued a charter in 1828. The plaintiffs argued that the defendant's charter infringed on their charter, in which they claimed the state granted them an exclusive right to control the crossing. The SJC split 2–2, and dismissed the case so that it could be heard by the Supreme Court. Morton wrote the decision favoring the defendants, pointing out that if the state was going to grant an exclusive right, it had to do so explicitly, and it had not done so in this case. This reasoning was upheld in 1837 by the Taney Supreme Court.

In 1838 Morton was the lone dissenter in Commonwealth v. Kneeland, the last time in the nation that someone was convicted of blasphemy. Abner Kneeland, a vitriolic former Universalist minister turned pantheist, had made statements Christians found offensive. Convicted by the trial court, Kneeland had appealed, and two more highly politicized trials ended in hung juries before the conviction was upheld in appeals. The full SJC took up the case in March 1836. Kneeland, representing himself, argued that the statements he made did not rise to level specified by the statute, and argued that the statute violated the First Amendment to the United States Constitution. Chief Justice Lemuel Shaw, writing for the court majority, found that Kneeland's speech satisfied the legal definition of blasphemy, and by narrow construction found that the law did not violate the state constitution's protections of free speech and religion. In his dissent Morton argued for a more liberal reading of the Article 2 of the state constitution (which addressed religious freedoms), and argued that every person "has a constitutional right to discuss the subject of God, to affirm or deny his existence. I cannot agree that a man may be punished for wilfully doing what he has a legal right to do." Governor Edward Everett refused to pardon Kneeland, who served sixty days in prison. The case is now one of the most frequently cited American cases on blasphemy.

=== Perennial candidate for governor ===
The political situation in the late 1820s and 1830s was quite fluid. The Democrats were highly factionalized, with three major groups vying with one another for control of the party apparatus. Morton's support base consisted mainly of farmers, industrial and shipyard laborers, and recent immigrants. A second faction, dominated by Theodore Lyman, consisted of merchants and wealthy coastal interests opposed to Whig interests. The third faction, which successfully controlled the party apparatus in its early years, was headed by David Henshaw, who had split from the John Quincy Adams camp over political aspects of the bridge controversy. Henshaw was the principal party organizing force, while Morton became a perennial gubernatorial candidate, running for the office each year from 1828 to 1843. The party was supported in its organizing efforts by Morton's friend John Calhoun, who served as Vice President under Adams and Jackson. Morton generally did no overt campaigning, sensitive to maintaining the appearance of neutrality as a judge.

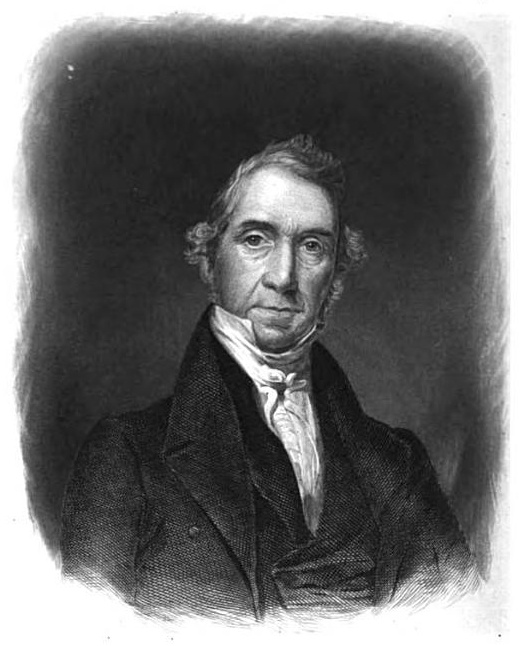
Engraved portrait of Morton

Morton was never able to make significant electoral inroads on Lincoln's majorities in the years the latter held the governor's seat (1825–1834). This was principally because opposition to the National Republicans was fragmented, exemplified by the Free Bridge Party and the Anti-Masonic Party, the latter of which in particular siphoned off significant numbers of Democratic votes in the 1832 election. Despite attempts by both the National Republicans and the Democrats to woo the Anti-Masons into their fold, neither was able to. Morton was mildly anti-Mason, but Henshaw was a Freemason, and Morton apparently did not recognize the potential power of the Anti-Masons despite their significant electoral showing. As a result, the Democrats lacked the voting strength to unseat the National Republicans. The Democrats were also splintered in 1832 and 1833, when the Working Men's Party drew support by attacking both of the larger parties for their lack of attention to labor issues. Morton was sufficiently disheartened by his repeated failures that he considered abandoning his quest for the governorship in 1832; Henshaw convinced him to soldier on. In 1831 Morton broke ranks with his friend John Calhoun over the latter's support for nullification, which Morton believed was based on his support for slavery. This also caused fractures in the Massachusetts Democratic Party, with Henshaw siding with Calhoun and the southern Democrats.

The closest Morton came to victory before 1839 was in the 1833 election, when Lincoln stepped down. In a four-way race involving Worcester Congressman John Davis (running as a National Republican) and John Quincy Adams (running as an Anti-Mason) as his principal opponents (along with a Working Men's candidate), none of the candidates received the required majority. The state legislature chose Davis, the largest vote-getter, after Adams withdrew in Davis's favor.

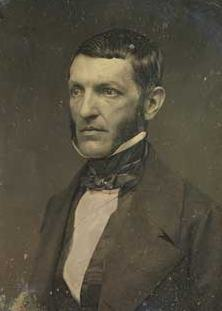
George Bancroft, historian and Massachusetts Democratic Party organizer

By the late 1830s activists for the abolition of slavery had grown into a potent political force in the state. Both Whigs and Democrats (including Morton) had avoided the issue in pursuit of other political objectives, but abolitionists began regularly requesting formal statements from candidates for office on the subject. Morton was known to be personally opposed to slavery, and this gained him votes in the 1837 and 1838 elections despite the vacillating answers he gave to such requests. His opponent in those elections, Edward Everett, was also opposed to slavery, but had in 1826 made a speech sympathetic to the rights of slaveholders, which was used against him. Morton's faction within the Democratic Party also gained strength due to the organizational skill of historian George Bancroft, and successful moves spearheaded by Morton to change the methods by which lower-level party leaders were chosen. David Henshaw resigned from the politically important post as the collector of the Port of Boston in 1837, starting a struggle within the party for this valuable patronage plum. Morton was one of several potential recipients, but eventually dropped out, suggesting it go instead to George Bancroft. Bancroft, from the western part of the state, attracted support from the Working Men into the Democratic fold.

== Governor ==
In the 1839 election, an unrelated issue came up that finally gave Morton a victory. The Whig legislature had passed a bill promoted by temperance activists that banned the sale of liquor in quantities less than 15 US gallons (57 L); this effectively outlawed service over a bar. The bill was seen by many as an instance of class elitism by the Whigs. The vote was so close that a recount was performed, and ballots were carefully scrutinized. One ballot counted for Morton contained the scrawl "Maccus Mattoon"; despite efforts by Whig partisans to deny that the writer intended to vote for Morton, no person with that name was found anywhere in the state. Everett graciously refused to persist in contesting the balloting, and Morton was certified the winner with 51,034 votes (exactly one more vote than half of all votes cast) to 50,725 for Everett with another 307 votes being scattered.

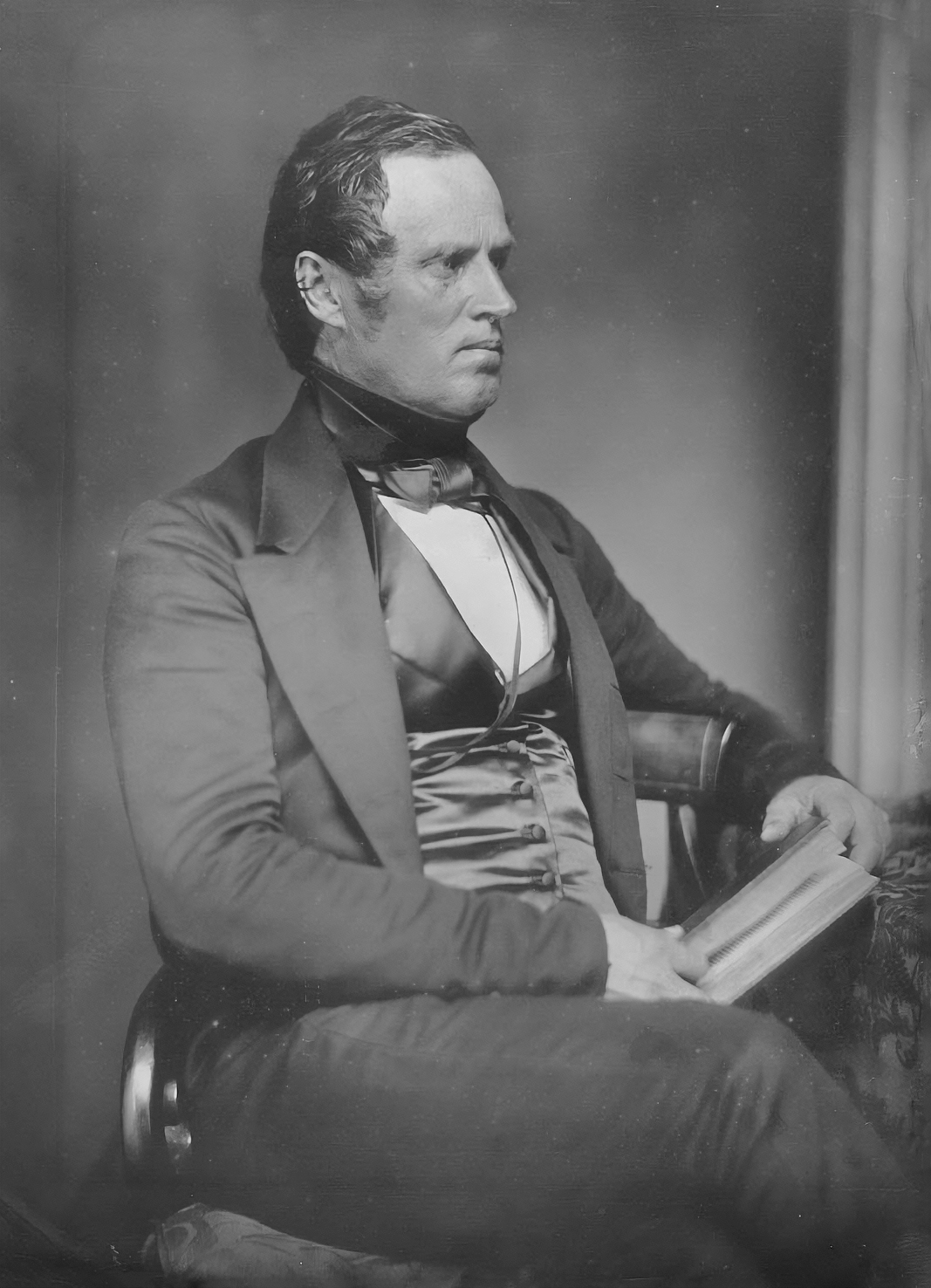
George N. Briggs defeated Morton in the 1843 election.

With a hostile Whig-dominated legislature, Morton's reform agenda went nowhere. Proposals such as reductions in the poll tax and the number of capital crimes were defeated, but the Democrats were able to introduce some fiscal discipline and produced the first budget surplus in some years. The Whigs attacked his proposals as poor economic policy, and regrouped to focus on defeating him in 1840. They convinced John Davis to return from the U.S. Senate to run against him, and Morton went down to defeat by a wide margin. He made some gains in the 1841 rematch. In 1842 the candidate of the upstart Liberty Party, an abolitionist party, secured enough votes to send the election to the state legislature. Because of the third party there were also a large number of vacancies in the state senate which was to choose the winner. The Liberty Party hoped to use its position in the balance of power to control the outcome, but a single Whig defector in the vote to fill the senate led to a Democratic majority in the chamber. The senate then went on to choose Morton as governor.

Morton once again called for a series of reforms, repeating those from 1840, and including a proposal to transfer the tax burden from real to personal property. He was criticized by the Whigs for omitting any mention of slavery in his inaugural address. During his term the leaders of the various Democratic factions squabbled over executive and party appointments, and the death of President William Henry Harrison shortly after taking office brought on further party divisions as potential presidential nominees canvassed the state for support. As a consequence, much of the reform agenda was either not implemented at all, or only minimally, despite a nominally working Democratic-Liberty coalition majority in the legislature. George Bancroft bemoaned the lost opportunity: "Never had a party a better opening than we have in Massachusetts, if all would but profit by our position. But they will not."

In the 1843 election Morton was set against George N. Briggs, a Whig lawyer from rural Berkshire County, who was chosen to counter Morton's appeal to rural voters. The Liberty candidate again won enough votes to deny either Briggs (who won a 3,000 vote plurality) or Morton a majority, and the election was sent to the legislature. The legislature had been returned to Whig control, and thus elected Briggs. The Whigs promptly undid most of the few reforms that were enacted during Morton's term.

== Later years ==
Following his 1843 defeat, Morton finally decided to stop running for governor, yielding the nomination in 1844 to George Bancroft. In September 1844 he traveled to neighboring Rhode Island, where he agitated for the release of Thomas Wilson Dorr, the leader of Dorr's Rebellion who had been sentenced to hard labor. Democratic sympathies for Dorr were used as ammunition against them by the Whigs in subsequent elections.

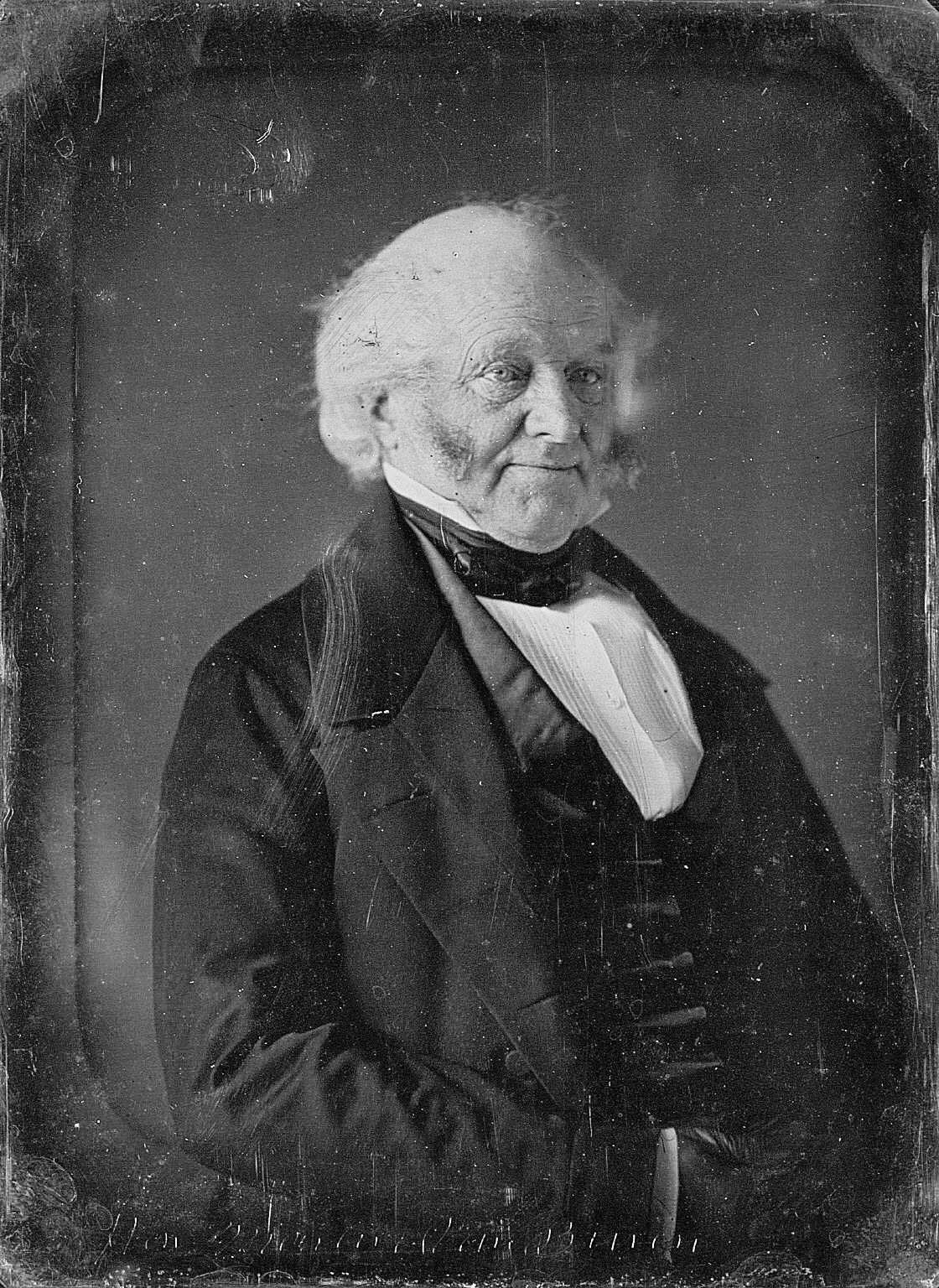
Martin Van Buren, daguerreotype c. 1849 by Mathew Brady

In 1845 President James K. Polk appointed Morton collector of the port of Boston; he served four years. Approval of his nomination in the U.S. Senate became somewhat controversial, with southern Senators objecting to him because of earlier statements he had made in opposition to slavery. Even before his appointment was approved, he began using the politically important post in an effort to bring the state party membership more in line with his vision, but only succeeded in widening the already existing fractures in the party organization. The divide resulted in a delay of his confirmation due to political intrigues by the Henshaw faction, and caused a permanent break in political relations between Morton and Bancroft. After an acrimonious state convention in 1847 (in which the Henshaw faction refused to allow platform items opposing slavery), Morton quit the party for the burgeoning Free Soil movement. Morton would refuse to support the Democrat-Free Soil coalition that in 1850 saw the election of Democrat George S. Boutwell as governor and Free Soiler Charles Sumner as U.S. Senator.

In 1848 Morton was invited by Martin Van Buren to run as the vice presidential nominee on the Free Soil ticket. Morton refused, arguing that Van Buren (a New Yorker) needed geographic diversity. Van Buren finally chose Wisconsin's Henry Dodge, but the party convention chose Massachusetts's Charles Francis Adams. Morton campaigned for Van Buren, who ended up polling third.

Morton was a delegate to the Massachusetts Constitutional Convention of 1853, and was elected on the Free Soil ticket to the Massachusetts House of Representatives in 1858, serving one term.

== Death and legacy ==
Morton died at his home in Taunton in 1864, nearly 80 years old, and was buried in its Mount Pleasant Cemetery. His home in Taunton later became the original building of Morton Hospital and Medical Center. It was demolished in the 1960s during hospital expansion.

His son, also named Marcus, followed him onto the state's supreme court, eventually serving as its chief justice. His daughter, Frances, was the mother of novelist Octave Thanet, and another daughter Lydia Mason Lee née Morton was wife of Henry Washington Lee, bishop of Iowa.

== Notes ==
Party political offices
First	Democratic nominee for Governor of Massachusetts; 1828, 1829, 1830, 1831, 1831, 1832, 1833, 1834, 1835, 1836, 1837, 1838, 1839, 1840, 1841, 1842, 1843	Succeeded by George Bancroft
U.S. House of Representatives
Preceded by Laban Wheaton	Member of the U.S. House of Representatives from Massachusetts's 10th congressional district 1817–1821	Succeeded by Francis Baylies
Political offices
Preceded by Levi Lincoln Jr.	Lieutenant Governor of Massachusetts; 1824 – May 26, 1825	Succeeded by Thomas L. Winthrop
Preceded by William Eustis as Governor	Acting Governor of Massachusetts; February 6, 1825 – May 26, 1825	Succeeded by Levi Lincoln Jr. as Governor
Preceded by Edward Everett	Governor of Massachusetts; January 18, 1840 – January 7, 1841	Succeeded by John Davis
Preceded by John Davis	Governor of Massachusetts; January 17, 1843 – January 1844	Succeeded by George N. Briggs
Legal offices
Preceded by Levi Lincoln Jr.	Associate Justice of the Massachusetts Supreme Judicial Court; 1825–1840	Vacant Title next held by Theron Metcalf
