= George Hull (Massachusetts politician) =

American politician

15th Lieutenant Governor of Massachusetts
- In office 1836–1843
- Governor: Edward Everett; Marcus Morton; John Davis
- Preceded by: Samuel Turell Armstrong
- Succeeded by: Henry H. Childs

Personal details
- Born: January 8, 1788 Farmington, Connecticut
- Died: January 7, 1868 (aged 79) Sandisfield, Massachusetts, US
- Party: Whig
- Spouse: Sarah Allen (m. 26 Oct 1815)
- Children: Albert Hull

George Hull (January 8, 1788 – January 7, 1868) was an American merchant, businessman, and politician from Massachusetts. A prominent shop owner in Sandisfield, Massachusetts, he served as the 15th lieutenant governor of Massachusetts from 1836 through 1843.

== Life ==
George Hull was born in Farmington, Connecticut, to Eliakim Hull, who moved his family to Sandisfield, Massachusetts, when George was twelve. The elder Hull opened a shop, in which his son was employed as a clerk. George Hull was educated in the local district school in Farmington prior to the family's move, but received no further formal education. He took over management of the store when he turned 21, and became prominent in local civic affairs, serving as the town's postmaster, town clerk, and in other civic posts. In addition to these activities, he owned farmland near the town center, and also operated a bank in nearby Lee.

In 1821 he was elected as a state representative as a Whig, and in 1823 and 1824 he won election to the state senate. In 1826 he was again elected as a state representative, although he was defeated in the same year in a bid for a seat in the United States Congress. In 1830 he won election to the Massachusetts Governor's Council, and in 1835 he began a seven-year stint as Lieutenant Governor of Massachusetts, serving under Governors Edward Everett, Marcus Morton, and John Davis. In his later years, he became a Republican.

For the last ten years of his life, he was afflicted with progressive blindness. His business suffered, due in part to his political activities and the economic effects of the American Civil War, and he was forced into bankruptcy in 1862.

He married Sarah Allen of Wethersfield, Connecticut; the couple had seven children.

Political offices
Preceded by Samuel T. Armstrong	Lieutenant Governor of Massachusetts; 1836 – 1843	Succeeded by Henry H. Childs
