= Edward Everett =

American politician, pastor, educator, diplomat and orator (1794–1865)

The Reverend Edward Everett
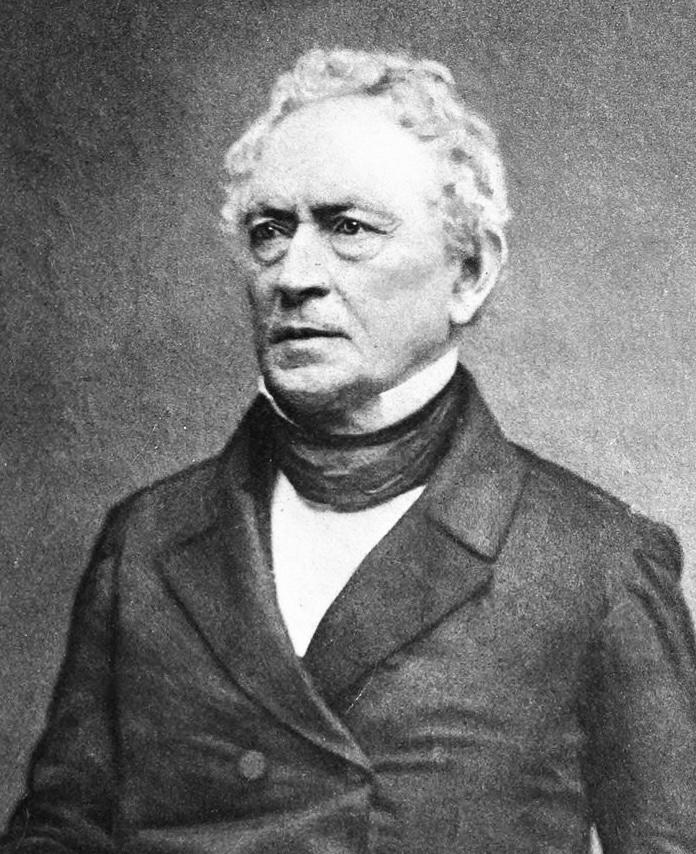
- Everett in the 1860s

20th United States Secretary of State
- In office November 6, 1852 – March 4, 1853
- President: Millard Fillmore
- Preceded by: Daniel Webster
- Succeeded by: William L. Marcy

United States Senator from Massachusetts
- In office March 4, 1853 – June 1, 1854
- Preceded by: John Davis
- Succeeded by: Julius Rockwell

16th President of Harvard University
- In office February 1846 – December 1848
- Preceded by: Josiah Quincy
- Succeeded by: Jared Sparks

15th United States Minister to the United Kingdom
- In office December 16, 1841 – August 8, 1845
- Nominated by: John Tyler
- Preceded by: Andrew Stevenson
- Succeeded by: Louis McLane

15th Governor of Massachusetts
- In office January 13, 1836 – January 18, 1840
- Lieutenant: George Hull
- Preceded by: Samuel Turell Armstrong (Acting)
- Succeeded by: Marcus Morton

Member of the U.S. House of Representatives from Massachusetts's 4th district
- In office March 4, 1825 – March 3, 1835
- Preceded by: Timothy Fuller
- Succeeded by: Samuel Hoar

Personal details
- Born: April 11, 1794 Dorchester, Massachusetts, U.S.
- Died: January 15, 1865 (aged 70) Boston, Massachusetts, U.S.
- Party: National Republican (Before 1834); Whig (1834–1854); Constitutional Union (1860–1864); National Union (1864–1865)
- Spouse: Charlotte Gray Brooks
- Children: 6
- Relatives: Alexander Hill Everett (brother); Edward Everett Hale (nephew); Lucretia Peabody Hale (niece); Susan Hale (niece); Charles Hale (nephew)
- Education: Harvard University (BA, MA); University of Göttingen (PhD)

Edward Everett (April 11, 1794 – January 15, 1865) was an American politician, Unitarian pastor, educator, diplomat, and orator from Massachusetts. Everett, as a Whig, served as U.S. representative, U.S. senator, the 15th governor of Massachusetts, minister to Great Britain, and United States secretary of state. He also taught at Harvard University and served as its president.

Everett was an American orator of the antebellum and Civil War eras. He was the featured orator at the dedication ceremony of the Gettysburg National Cemetery in 1863, where he spoke for over two hours—immediately before President Abraham Lincoln delivered his famous two-minute Gettysburg Address.

Everett was educated at Harvard, and briefly ministered at Boston's Brattle Street Church before taking a teaching job at Harvard. The position included preparatory studies in Europe, so Everett spent two years in studies at the University of Göttingen, and another two years traveling around Europe. At Harvard he taught ancient Greek literature for several years before starting an extensive and popular speaking career. He served ten years in the United States Congress before winning election as Governor of Massachusetts in 1835. As Governor he introduced the state Board of Education, the first of its type in the nation. In 1831, he was elected as a member to the American Philosophical Society.

After being narrowly defeated in the 1839 election, Everett was appointed Minister to Great Britain, serving until 1845. He next became President of Harvard, a job he quickly came to dislike. In 1849, he became an assistant to longtime friend and colleague Daniel Webster, who had been appointed Secretary of State. Upon Webster's death Everett served as Secretary of State for a few months until he was sworn in as U.S. Senator from Massachusetts. In the later years of his life, Everett traveled and gave speeches all over the country. He supported efforts to maintain the Union before the Civil War, running for Vice President on the Constitutional Union Party ticket in 1860. He was active in supporting the Union effort during the war and supported Lincoln in the 1864 election.

== Early life and education ==
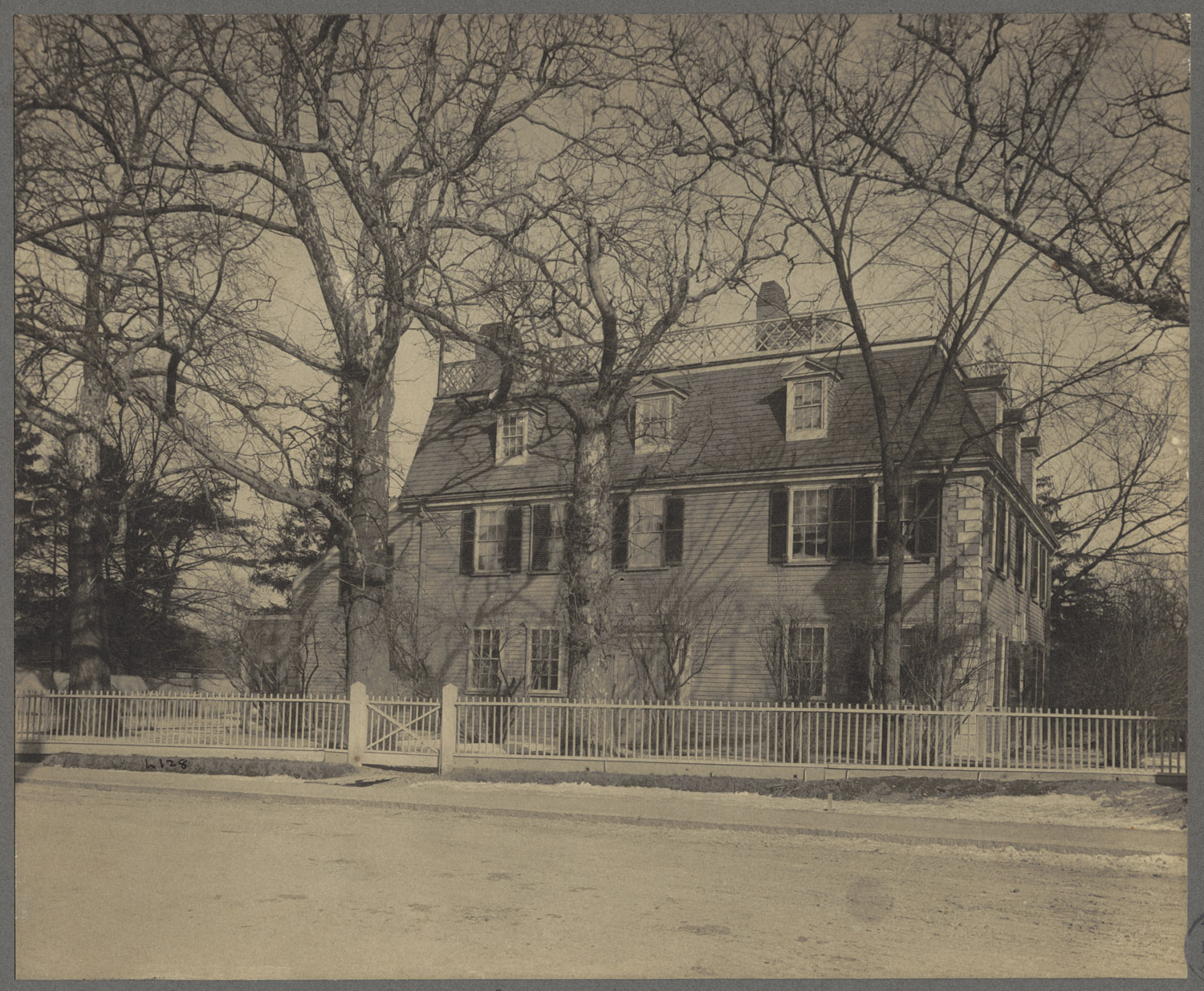
Birthplace of Everett in Dorchester, Massachusetts. ca.1898 photo

Edward Everett was born on April 11, 1794, in Dorchester, Massachusetts (then independent from Boston), the fourth of eight children, to the Reverend Oliver Everett and Lucy Hill Everett, the daughter of Alexander Sears Hill. His father, a native of Dedham, Massachusetts, was a descendant of early colonist Richard Everett, and his mother's family also had deep colonial roots. His father had served as pastor of New South Church, retiring due to poor health two years before Everett was born. He died in 1802, when Edward was eight, after which his mother moved the family to Boston. He attended local schools, and then a private school of Ezekiel Webster. During this time Ezekiel's brother Daniel sometimes taught classes; Everett and Daniel Webster would later form a close friendship. His sister was Sarah Preston Hale.

Everett attended Boston Latin School in 1805, and then briefly Phillips Exeter Academy, where his older brother Alexander Hill Everett was teaching. At the age of 13, he was admitted to Harvard College. In 1811, at age 17, he graduated as the valedictorian of his class. Unlike some of the other students at the time, Everett was an earnest and diligent student who absorbed all of what was taught. While a student, he was a member of the Porcellian Club, and of the Hasty Pudding Club.

== Pastor and student ==
Uncertain what to do next, Everett was encouraged by his pastor, Joseph Stevens Buckminster of the Brattle Street Church, to study for the ministry. This Everett did under the tutelage of Harvard President John Thornton Kirkland, earning his MA in 1813. During this time in particular he developed a facility for working with both the written and spoken word. The Reverend Buckminster died in 1812, and Everett was immediately offered the post at the Brattle Street Church on a probationary basis after his graduation, which was made permanent in November 1813. Everett dedicated himself to the work, and became a highly popular Unitarian preacher. Listeners wrote of his "florid and affluent fancy", and his "daring imagery", while one critic wrote what would become a common criticism of his speaking style: "[Everett] spoke like some superior intelligence, discoursing to mortals of what they ought to feel and know, but as if [he] himself were too far exalted to require such feelings, and such knowledge himself." Everett, over the year he served in the pulpit, came to be disenchanted with the somewhat formulaic demands of the required oratory, and with the sometimes parochial constraints the congregation placed on him.

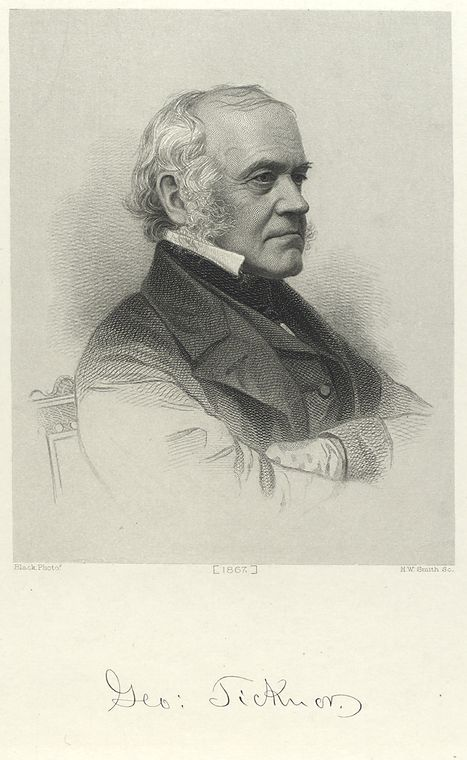
Everett's friend George Ticknor (1867 engraving)

The workload also took its toll on young Everett, who around this time acquired the nickname "Ever-at-it", which would be used throughout his life. For a change of pace, Everett traveled to Washington, D.C., where he visited with Daniel Webster and other Federalist Party luminaries from Massachusetts. In late 1814 Everett was offered a newly endowed position as professor of Greek literature at Harvard. The position came with authorization to travel for two years in Europe, and Everett readily accepted. He was formally invested as a professor in April 1815. Everett was also elected a member of the American Antiquarian Society in 1815.

Everett made his way across western Europe, visiting London and the major Dutch cities en route to the German city of Göttingen. There he entered the university, where he studied French, German, and Italian, along with Roman law, archaeology, and Greek art. He was a disciplined student, but he and George Ticknor, with whom he had traveled, were also quite sociable. Everett noted that they were viewed by many at the university as curiosities, and were often the focus of attention. He was granted a Ph. D in September 1817, which he believed to be the first such degree awarded to an American.

During his sojourn at Göttingen, Everett traveled to see other German cities, including Hanover, Weimar, Dresden, and Berlin. He received permission from Harvard to extend his time in Europe, and spent two more years traveling across the continent (from Constantinople and the Black Sea to Paris), visiting the major cities of the continent before returning to the United States in 1819. Among those he met in England were the Prussian diplomat Wilhelm von Humboldt, an influential architect of the Prussian education system, and William Wilberforce, a leading English abolitionist. While in Constantinople Everett acquired a number of ancient Greek texts which are now in the Harvard archives.

== Teacher, writer, and speaker ==
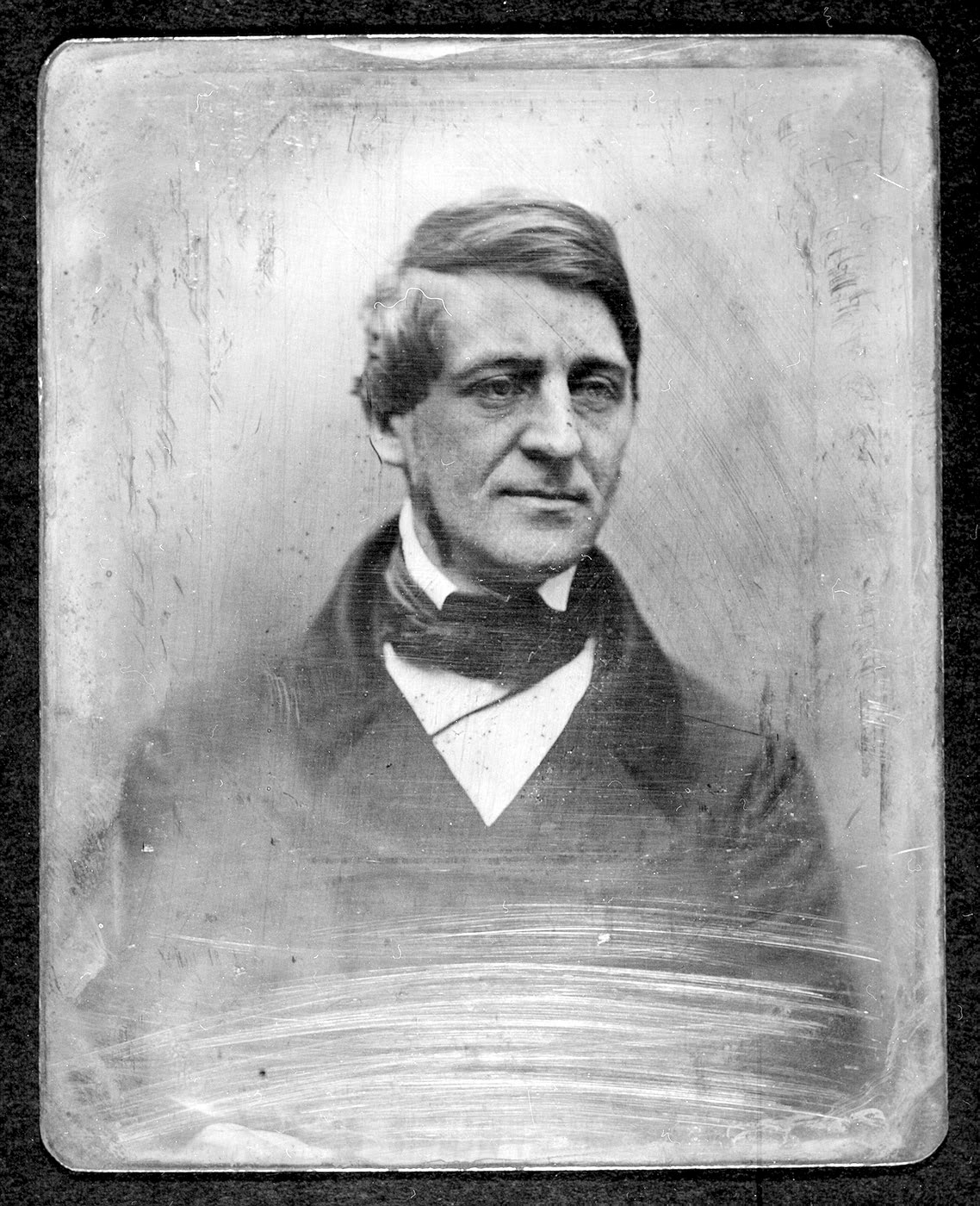
Everett's student Ralph Waldo Emerson, daguerreotype by unknown photographer

Everett took up his teaching duties later in 1819, hoping to implant the scholarly methods of Germany at Harvard and bring a generally wider appreciation of German literature and culture to the United States. For his Greek class he translated Philipp Karl Buttmann's Greek lexicon. Among his students were future Speaker of U.S. House of Representatives Robert Charles Winthrop, presidential son and future U.S. Representative Charles Francis Adams, and future philosopher and essayist Ralph Waldo Emerson. Emerson had first heard Everett speak at the Brattle Street Church, and idolized him. He wrote that Everett's voice was "of such rich tones, such precise and perfect utterance, that, although slightly nasal, it was the most mellow and beautiful and correct of all instruments of the time."

In 1820 Everett was elected a Fellow of the American Academy of Arts and Sciences. That year he became editor of the North American Review, a literary magazine to which he had contributed articles while studying in Europe. In addition to editing he made numerous contributions to the magazine, which flourished during his tenure and reached a nationwide audience. He was also instrumental in expanding Harvard's collections of German language works, including grammars, lexicons, and a twenty-volume edition of the collected works of Johann Wolfgang von Goethe, whom Everett had visited in Weimar and whose works he championed on the pages of the Review.

I die daily of a cramped spirit, fluttering and beating from side to side of a cage.

— Everett, describing how he felt about teaching in 1821

Everett began his public speaking career while he taught at Harvard, which combined with his editorship of the Review to bring him some national prominence. He preached at a service held in the United States Capitol that brought him wide notice and acclaim in political circles. In 1822, he delivered a series of lectures in Boston on art and antiquities. The series was well attended, and he repeated it in subsequent years. He made a major speech in December 1823 advocating American support of the Greeks in their struggle for independence from the Ottoman Empire. This subject was adopted by Daniel Webster, who also made it the subject of a speech in Congress. (Everett's support for Greek independence made him something of a hero in Greece, and his portrait hangs in the National Gallery in Athens.) This collaboration between Webster and Everett was the start of a lifelong political association between the two men.

Everett delivered speeches commemorating the opening battles of the American Revolution in Concord, Massachusetts in 1825 and Lexington, Massachusetts in 1835.

== Marriage and children ==
On May 8, 1822, Everett married Charlotte Gray Brooks (1800–1859), a daughter of Peter Chardon Brooks and Ann Gorham, who like Everett were of old New England lineage. Brooks had made a fortune in a variety of business endeavors, including marine insurance, and would financially support Everett when he embarked on his career in politics. Everett would also become associated through the Brooks family with John Quincy Adams' son Charles Francis Adams, Sr., who married Charlotte's sister Abigail.

The Everetts had a happy and fruitful marriage, producing six children who survived infancy:

1. Anne Gorham Everett (1823–1843)
2. Charlotte Brooks Everett (1825–1879); married Captain Henry Augustus Wise USN
3. Grace Webster Everett (1827–1836)
4. Edward Brooks Everett (1830–1861); married Helen Cordis Adams
5. Henry Sidney Everett (1834–1898); married Katherine Pickman Fay
6. William Everett (1839–1910); U.S. Representative from Massachusetts

== Early political career ==
Portrait of Everett attributed to Sarah Goodridge, c. 1825

Everett had decided as early as 1821 that he was not interested in teaching. On August 26, 1824, Everett gave an unexpectedly significant speech at Harvard's Phi Beta Kappa Society that would alter his career trajectory. Publicity for the event was dominated by the news that the Marquis de Lafayette, the French hero of the American Revolution, would be in attendance, and the hall was packed. The subject of Everett's speech was "Circumstances of the Favorable Progress of Literature in America". He pointed out that America's situation as an expanding nation with a common language and a democratic foundation gave its people a unique and distinctive opportunity for creating truly American literature. Unfettered by Europe's traditions and bureaucracy, Americans could use the experiences of settling the west to develop a new style of intellectual thought.

The crowd reacted with lengthy applause, and not long afterward an informal non-partisan caucus nominated Everett as its candidate for the United States House of Representatives. Other political factions also endorsed his candidacy, and he was easily elected in the November 1824 election. He had expected to continue teaching at Harvard while serving, but was informed by its Board of Overseers that he had been dismissed because of the election victory. He took this news well, even agreeing to refund to the college the costs of his European travels. He continued to remain associated with Harvard, joining the Board of Overseers in 1827 and serving for many years.

=== United States representative ===
The political situation in the country was quite fluid in the late 1820s. The Federalist Party had collapsed, and the victorious Democratic-Republican Party had become diffuse, resulting in political factionalism in place of party affiliation. Everett was associated with the "National Republican" faction of John Quincy Adams and Henry Clay. He supported Clay's "National System"—which called for protective tariffs, internal improvements, and a national bank—and the interests of Massachusetts' propertied class. Everett was re-elected to four additional terms as a National Republican, serving until 1835. The National Republicans formally became the Whig Party in 1834.

In Congress Everett sat on the House Committee on Foreign Affairs, and on the Committee on Libraries and Public Buildings, both of which he chaired in his last term. Since he was already well known to President Adams, he was a frequent guest at the White House, and came to champion the president's agenda in the House. He supported tariff legislation that protected Massachusetts' growing industrial interests, favored renewal of the charter of the Second Bank of the United States, and opposed the Indian Removal Act.

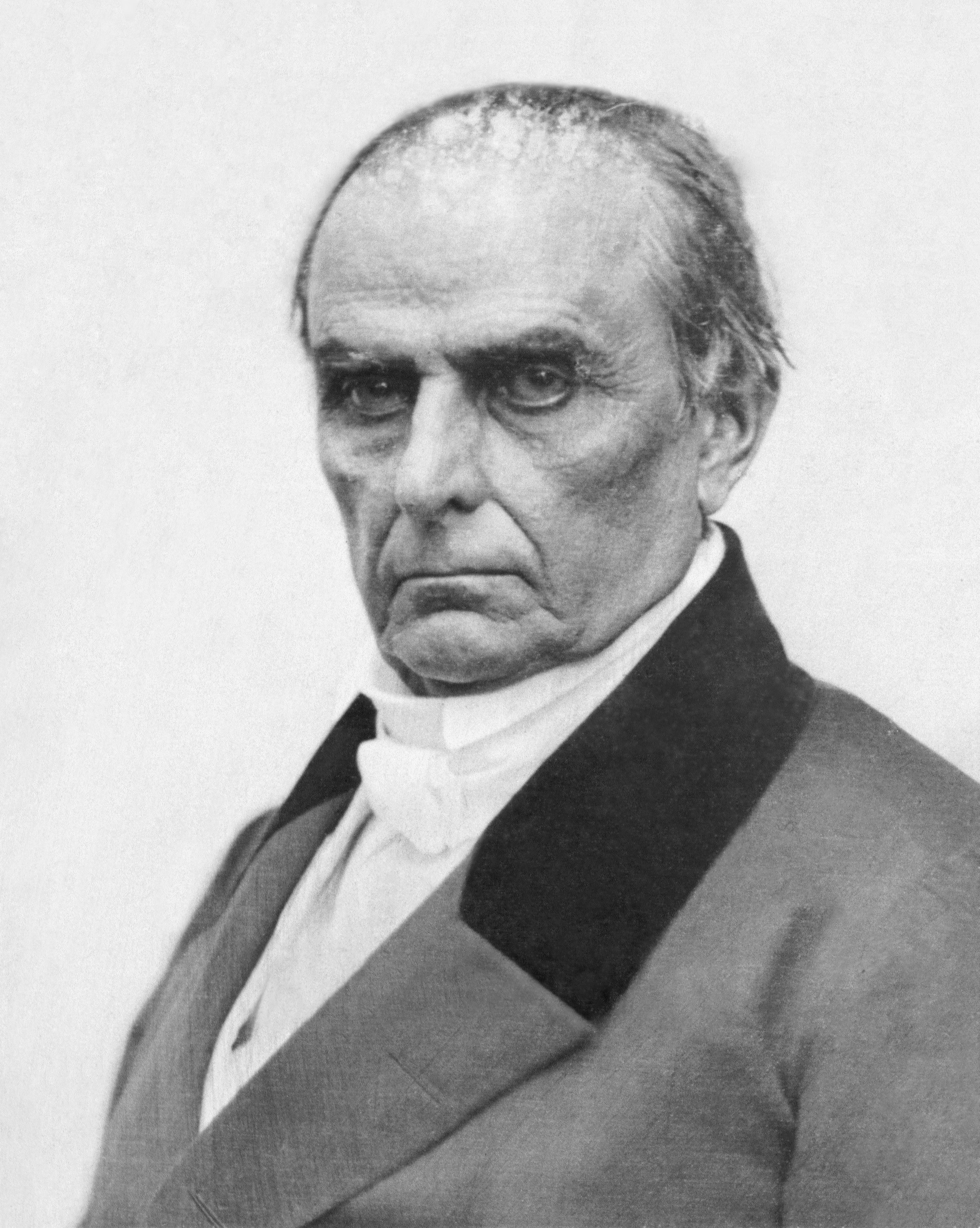
Daniel Webster, c. 1847 (Southworth & Hawes)

Everett's most controversial action in Congress took place relatively early during his tenure there. In 1826 Congress debated a Constitutional amendment to alter the way the president was elected, so that Congress would not be required to decide (as it had in the 1824 election). Rising in opposition to the amendment on March 9, 1826, Everett delivered a three-hour speech in which he generally opposed the need to amend the Constitution. However, he also expounded on the issue of slavery, noting that "the New Testament says 'Slaves obey your masters'", and accepting the document even though it contained the Three-Fifths Compromise. Of slavery itself, Everett said, "domestic slavery is not, in my judgement, to be set down as an immoral and irreligious institution," and vowed he would "see [North America] sunk in the bottom of the ocean, before I would see any part of this fair America converted into a continental Hayti."

Reaction to this speech was highly critical, and Everett was attacked by political friends and foes for this apparent endorsement of slavery. He attempted to justify his statements by pointing out that he rejected the slave trade and the act of kidnapping someone into slavery, but this did not mitigate the damage, and he was heavily criticized for it in the Massachusetts press. Everett would be dogged by the speech for the rest of his political career.

=== Governor of Massachusetts ===
Everett retired from Congress in 1835, after deciding that he did not really like the rough-and-tumble nature of the proceedings in the House. He had been offered the nomination for governor of Massachusetts by the Anti-Masonic Party in 1834; although he was known to be against secret societies like the Freemasons, he refused, and supported Whig John Davis for governor that year. Davis won the election, which was held in November 1834. In February 1835, the state legislature elected Davis to the United States Senate. In an arrangement brokered in part by Daniel Webster, Everett was promised the Whig nomination for governor (a move that upset Lieutenant Governor Samuel Turell Armstrong, who also sought the nomination). Everett easily defeated the perennial Democratic Party candidate, Marcus Morton, in November 1835. He was re-elected by comfortable margins in the three following years, all facing Morton.

In 1836 he was elected a member of the Ancient and Honorable Artillery Company of Massachusetts.

One of the most notable achievements of Everett's tenure was the introduction of a state board of education to improve school quality and the establishment of normal schools for the training of teachers. Based on details of the Prussian education system which Everett had learned about, this groundbreaking accomplishment would be emulated by other states. The state Board of Education was established in 1837, with reformer Horace Mann as its secretary. The state's first normal school opened in Lexington the next year (it afterward moved to Framingham and is now known as Framingham State University).

Marcus Morton was Everett's principal opponent for governor.

Other accomplishments during Everett's tenure include the authorization of an extension of the railroad system from Worcester to the New York state line, and assistance in the quieting of border tensions between Maine and the neighboring British (now Canadian) province of New Brunswick. Massachusetts was involved in this dispute because, as part of Maine's separation from the state in 1820, it retained ownership of public lands in the disputed area. The border issue had been simmering for some years, but tensions rose substantially in the late 1830s as both sides pushed development activity into the disputed area, and the United States refused to accept a mediation proposal made by the Dutch king. In 1838 Everett proposed to President Martin Van Buren that a special commission be established to address the issue.

Abolitionism and temperance were two issues that became more politically prominent during Everett's tenure, and both of those matters, as well as Whig indifference, would play a role in his defeat in the 1839 election. The abolitionist Liberty Party began to take shape in 1838, and the ill-timed passage of a temperance law banning the sale of less than 15 US gallons (57 L) of alcohol would drive popular support away from the Whigs in 1839. The election, held November 11, 1839, was so close that the results were scrutinized by the (Whig-dominated) legislature when it met in January 1840. A joint legislative committee reported that Morton received exactly one-half the votes cast, sufficient to secure his victory. (One vote less for Morton would have resulted in the Whig legislature deciding the election.) Everett refused to contest the results despite calls from the party to do so; he wrote, "I am willing to let the election go."

== Diplomatic service ==
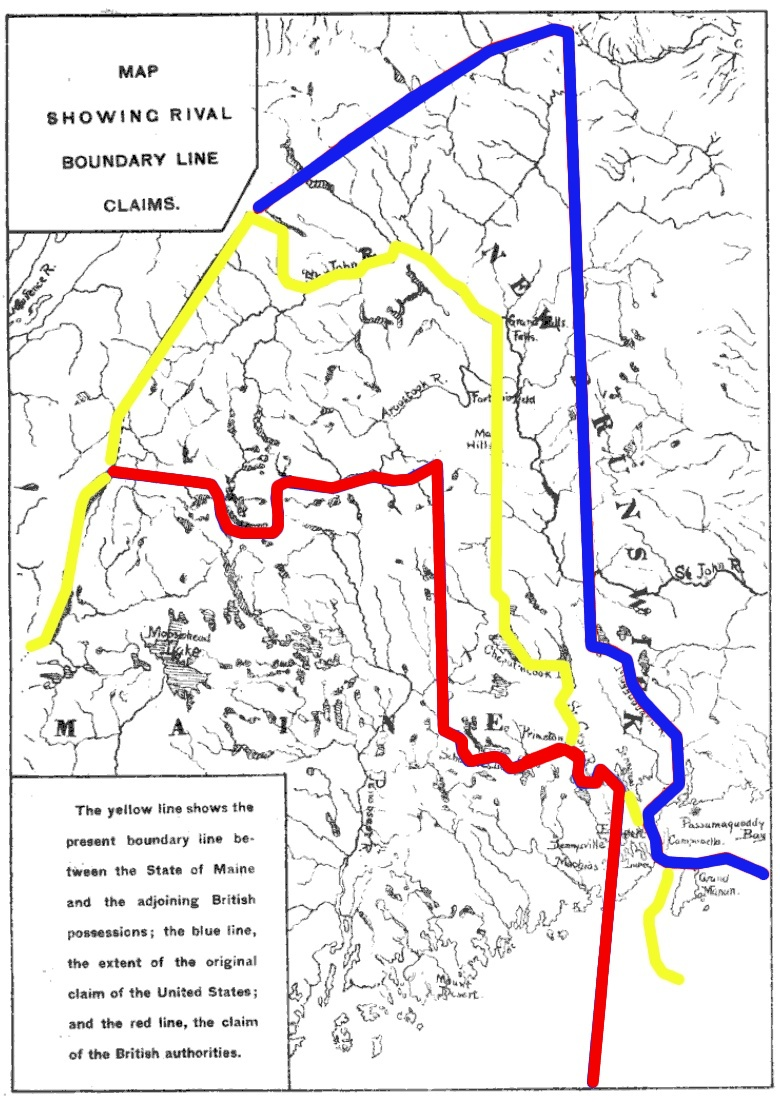
Map showing the extreme boundary claims (red=British, blue=United States), and the final border (yellow)

After leaving office, Everett traveled in Europe with his family for several months. When the Whigs, led by William Henry Harrison, won the 1840 presidential election, Everett was appointed Ambassador to Great Britain at the recommendation of his friend Daniel Webster, who had been appointed Secretary of State. Everett was at first charged with handling the northeast border issues he first encountered as governor. A new British administration, friendlier to the United States than the previous one, sent Lord Ashburton to Washington to negotiate directly with Webster, and Everett's role was reduced to acquiring documents from British records, and pressing the American case to the Foreign Office. In this role Everett was instrumental in acquiring and distributing a map that vindicated the United States from accusations that it had cheated Britain out of land in the 1842 Webster–Ashburton Treaty.

Another major issue between the countries was the seizure of American ships by British naval forces interdicting the slave trade off the coast of Africa. Owners of ships accused but acquitted of complicity in the trade filed claims to recover their losses with the British government, and Everett, as ambassador, advanced these cases. In this he was generally successful, given the friendly British stance. One aspect of the slave trade interdiction proposed by Everett found its way into the treaty negotiated by Webster: the stationing of an American squadron off the coast of Africa to cooperate with the British effort. The issue of slaving-related seizures caused some friction at home, especially after Webster was replaced as Secretary of State by a succession of Southern politicians. Everett in particular had to school John C. Calhoun on the diplomatic ramifications of pursuing claims after slaves rose up aboard a ship plying the American coast and sailed it to the Bahamas.

Everett rebuffed several offers for other diplomatic posts proffered by Webster, who was unhappy serving under Tyler and apparently sought the UK ambassadorship as a way to distance himself from the unpopular president; Webster eventually resigned in 1843. Everett remained at his post until 1845, when after the accession of James K. Polk to the presidency he was replaced by Democrat Louis McLane. His last months in the post were occupied with the Oregon boundary dispute, which was eventually resolved by McLane along lines negotiated by Everett.

== Harvard presidency ==
Even before his departure from London, Everett was being considered as a possible successor to Josiah Quincy as President of Harvard. Everett returned to Boston in September 1845 to learn that the Overseers had offered him the post. Although he had some misgivings, principally due to some of the tedious aspects of the job and difficult matter of maintaining student discipline, he accepted the offer, and entered into his duties in February 1846.

The three years he spent there were extremely unhappy. Everett found that Harvard was short of resources, and that he was not popular with the rowdy students. One of his most notable achievements was the expansion of Harvard's academic programs to include a "school of theoretical and practical science", then known as the Lawrence Scientific School. On April 15, 1848, he delivered the eulogy for John Quincy Adams, who had died two months earlier while serving in the House of Representatives.

Everett's unhappiness with the post was apparent early on, and by April 1847 he was negotiating with Harvard's overseers about the conditions of the job. These talks were ultimately unfruitful, and Everett, on the advice of his doctor, resigned the post in December 1848. He had been suffering for sometime from a number of maladies, some of them prostate-related. In the following years, his health would become increasingly fragile. He was somewhat rejuvenated by a visit to the springs at Sharon Springs, New York.

== Secretary of state and U.S. senator ==
Portrait of Everett, c. 1845

When the Whigs won the 1848 national election and returned to power in 1849, Everett returned to politics. He served as an aide to Daniel Webster, who President Millard Fillmore appointed Secretary of State. When Webster died in October 1852, Fillmore appointed Everett, apparently at Webster's request, to serve as Secretary of State during the remaining lame-duck months of his administration. In this post Everett drafted the official letter that accompanied the Perry Expedition to Japan, reversed Webster's claim denying Peruvian sovereignty over the guano-rich Lobos Islands, and refused to engage the United States in an agreement with the United Kingdom and France to guarantee Spanish control of Cuba. Although he stated that the Fillmore administration had no interest in annexing Cuba, he made it clear that the U.S. did not want to foreclose the option by engaging in an essentially political alliance, and reinforced the notion that the U.S. saw Cuba as its concern and not a matter for outside interference.

While he was still serving as secretary of state, Everett was approached by Massachusetts Whig leaders about running for the United States Senate. He was elected by the state legislature, and took the office on March 4, 1853. In the Senate he sat on the Foreign Relations Committee, and on the Committee on Territories. He was opposed to the extension of slavery in the western territories, but was concerned that the radical Free Soil Party's hardline stance would result in disunion. The aloofness that characterized Everett's style in the pulpit decades before remained in evidence during these years. At President Pierce's White House socials, wrote one observer, Everett seemed as "cold-blooded and impassible, bright and lonely as the gilt weather-cock over the church in which he officiated ere he became a politician."

Everett opposed the 1854 Kansas–Nebraska Act, which allowed the territories to choose whether to allow slavery by popular vote, calling it a "horrible" and "detested" bill. However, because of his health he missed a critical vote on the bill, departing the chamber during a debate that ended up lasting all night. This angered Massachusetts anti-slavery interests, who sent him a strongly-worded petition to submit to the Senate. Because of his distaste for the more extreme elements in the abolition debate, Everett's speech in support of the petition was weak, for which he was further criticized. The rancor of the situation greatly upset Everett, and he submitted his resignation letter on May 12, 1854, after only a little more than one year into his six-year term, once again citing poor health.

== Last years ==
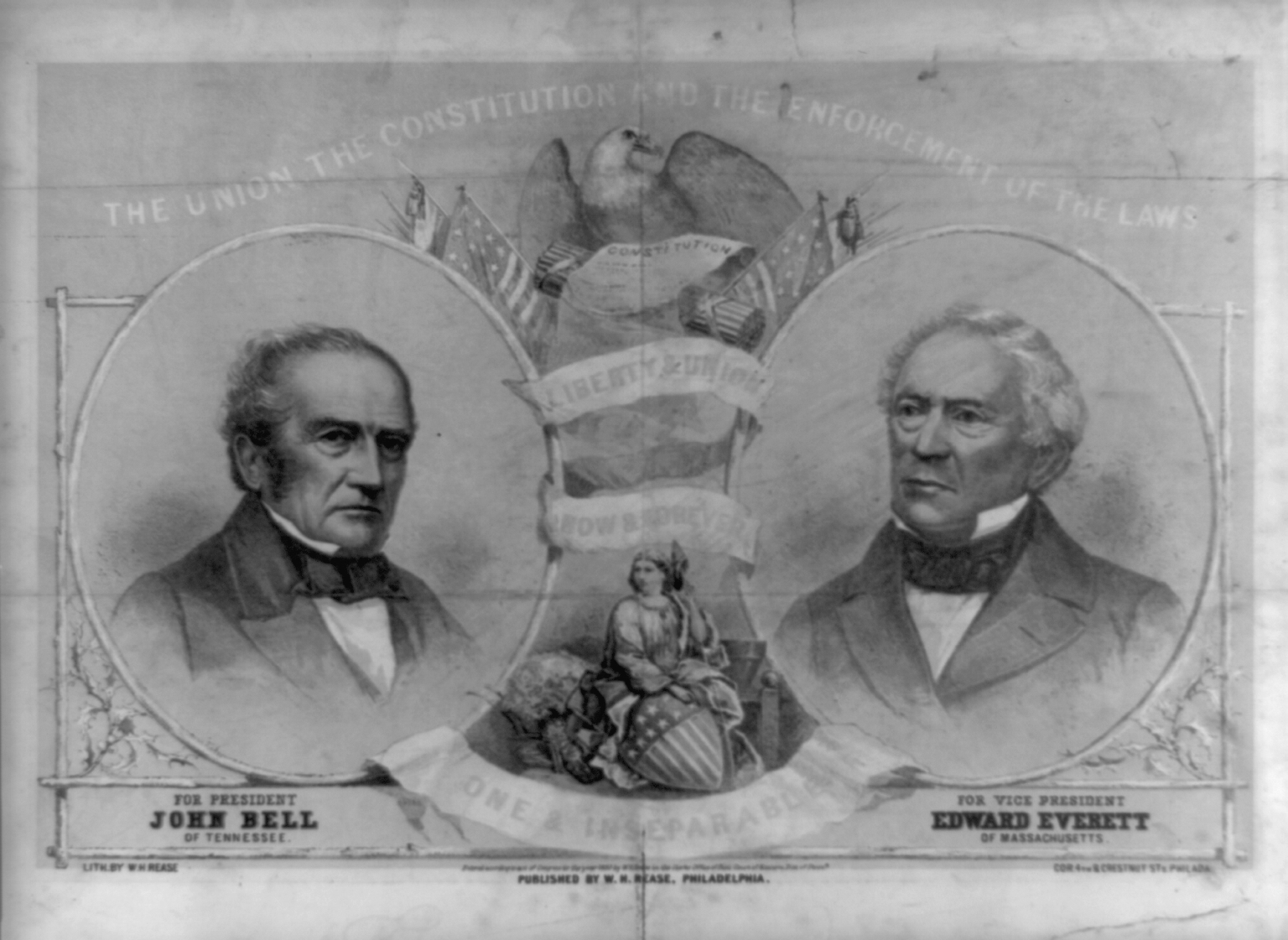
Poster for the Constitutional Union Party ticket of 1860; Everett is to the right, John Bell to the left

Free of political obligations, Everett traveled the country with his family, giving public speeches. One cause he took up was the preservation of George Washington's home at Mount Vernon. Over several years in the mid-1850s he toured, speaking about Washington whom he compared favorably to Frederick the Great and the Duke of Marlborough. Not only did Everett donate the proceeds from this touring (about $70,000), he also refused to deduct his travel expenses. He also agreed to write a weekly column for the New York Ledger in exchange for a $10,000 gift to the Mount Vernon Ladies' Association. These columns were eventually bound and sold as the Mount Vernon Papers.

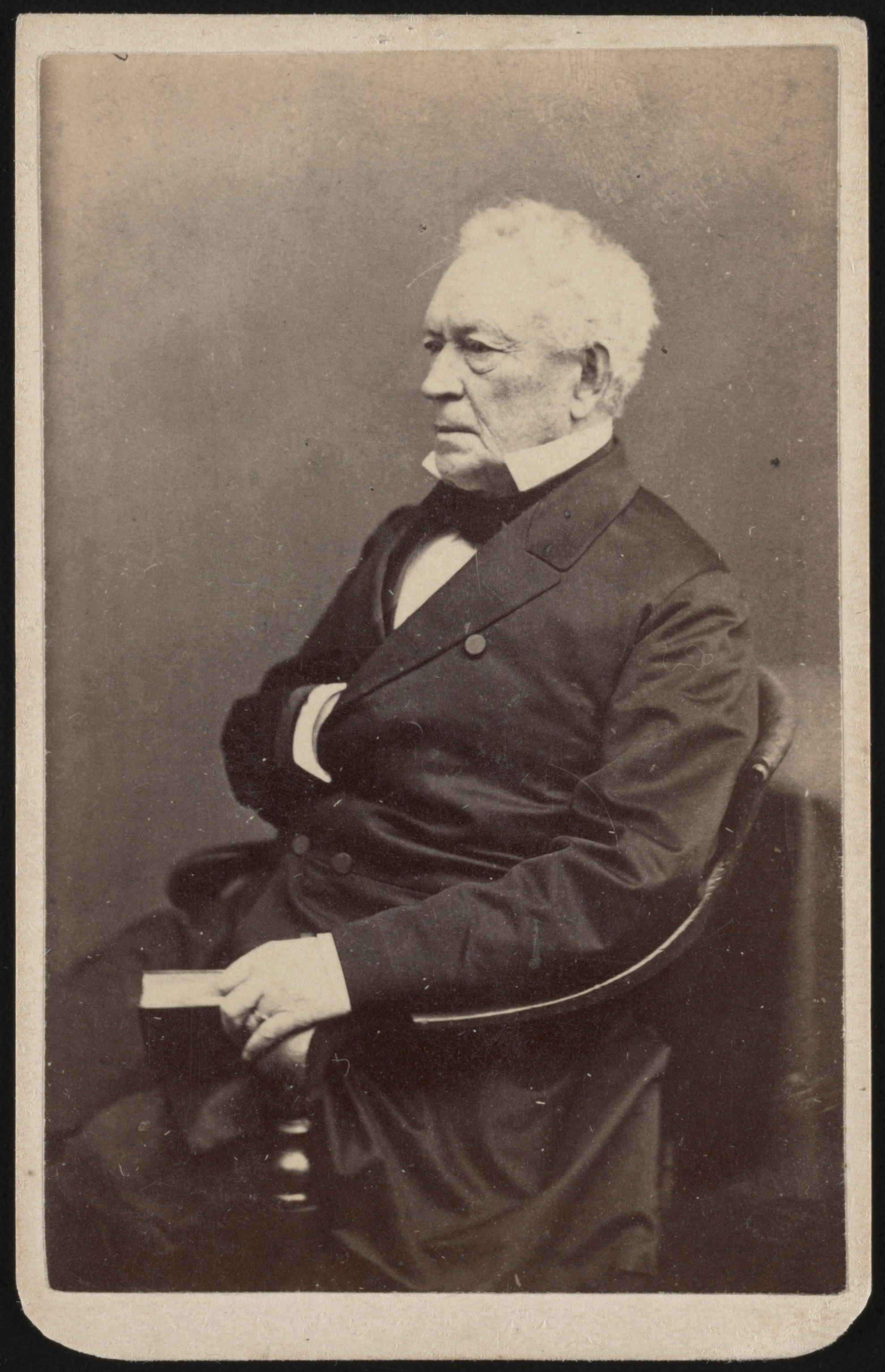
Photograph of Edward Everett by James Wallace Black. From the Liljenquist Family Collection of Civil War Photographs, Prints and Photographs Division, Library of Congress

Everett was disheartened by the sectional divisions between the Northern and Southern states during the late 1850s. In 1859 he was the keynote speaker at an anti-John Brown rally that filled Faneuil Hall to capacity.

The 1860 election threatened to produce a national crisis, with pro-slavery Southerners splitting the Democratic Party and threatening secession if a Republican were to be elected president. A group of conservative ex-Whigs organized the Constitutional Union Party, which claimed as its sole principle the preservation of the Union. Supporters of Everett put his name forward as a candidate for president, but the party ended up nominating John Bell, and Everett for vice president. Everett reluctantly accepted the post, but did not campaign very much. The Bell–Everett ticket received only 39 electoral votes, all from Southern states.

In the wake of the election of Abraham Lincoln, seven, later eleven Southern states began seriously debating secession. Everett was an active participant in advancing the unsuccessful Crittenden Compromise in a last-ditch attempt to avoid war during the early months of 1861. When the American Civil War broke out in April 1861, he became an active supporter of the Union cause. He did not at first think highly of Lincoln, but came to support him as the war progressed. In 1861 and 1862 Everett toured the Northern states, lecturing on the causes of the war, and also wrote on behalf of the Union cause for the New York Ledger. Proposals were put forward that Everett serve as a roving ambassador in Europe to counter Confederate diplomatic initiatives, but these were never brought to fruition.

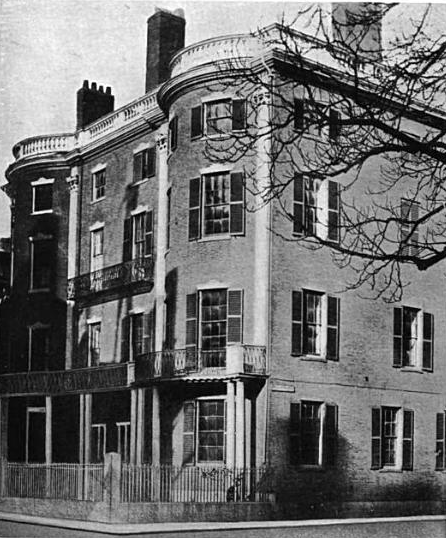
Everett lived in this house on Summer Street, Boston, 1852–1865

In November 1863, when Gettysburg National Cemetery was dedicated, Everett, by then widely renowned as the finest orator in the country, was invited to be the featured speaker. In his two-hour formal oration he compared the Battle of Gettysburg to battles of antiquity such as Marathon, and spoke about how opposing sides in previous civil wars (such as the War of the Roses and the Thirty Years' War) were able to reconcile their differences afterward. Everett's oration was followed by the now far more famous Gettysburg Address of President Lincoln. For his part, Everett was deeply impressed by the concise speech and wrote to Lincoln noting "I should be glad if I could flatter myself that I came as near to the central idea of the occasion, in two hours, as you did in two minutes." In the 1864 election, Everett supported Lincoln, serving as a presidential elector from Massachusetts for the Republicans.

== Death ==
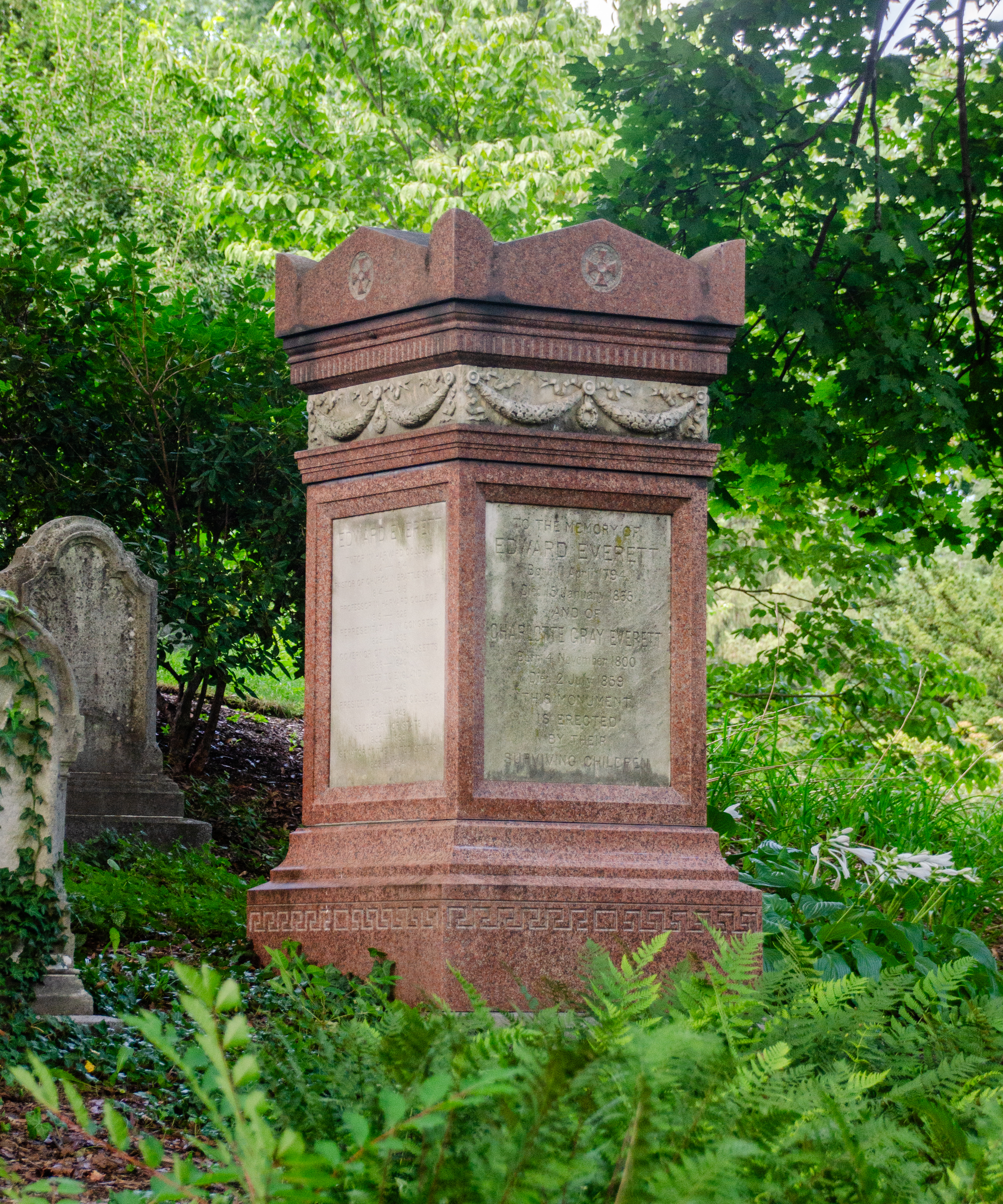
The Edward Everett monument at Mount Auburn Cemetery, designed by Peabody & Stearns

On January 9, 1865, at the age of 70, Everett spoke at a public meeting in Boston to raise funds for the southern poor in Savannah. At that meeting he caught a cold, which turned into pneumonia four days later, after he had testified for three hours in a civil dispute concerning property he owned in Winchester, Massachusetts. Everett wrote a letter to the publishers N. A. & R. A. the morning of his death, in which he said: "I have been very ill." He died in Boston on January 15, and was interred at Mount Auburn Cemetery in Cambridge.

== Legacy ==
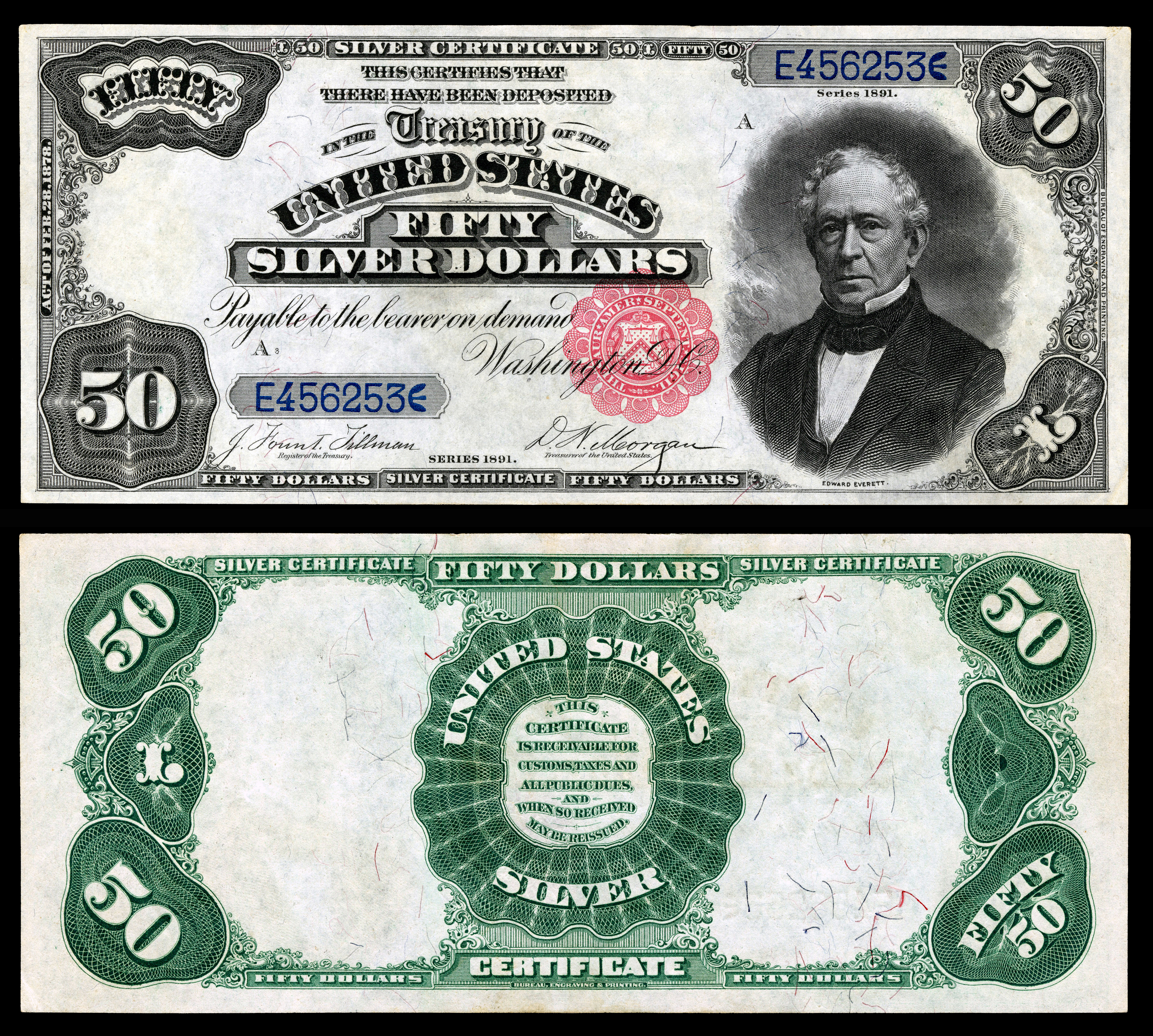
Everett depicted on the Series 1891 $50 silver certificate.

Edward Everett Square, near his birthplace in Dorchester, is named for him. It is the intersection of Columbia Road, Massachusetts Avenue, East Cottage Street and Boston Street. A marker is placed near where his birthplace stood, and a statue of Everett stands near the square in Richardson Park. Everett's name appears on the facade of the Boston Public Library's McKim Building, which he helped found, serving for twelve years as president of its board. His name was also given to his nephew, Edward Everett Hale, as well as Hale's grandson, the actor Edward Everett Horton.

Everett, Massachusetts, separated from Malden in 1870, was named in his honor, as was the borough of Everett, Pennsylvania, and Mount Everett in western Massachusetts. Elementary schools in Dorchester and in Lincoln, Nebraska are named for him, as was a school in St. Cloud, Minnesota that was torn down in 1887. Everett donated 130 books to St. Cloud, beginning the community's first library.

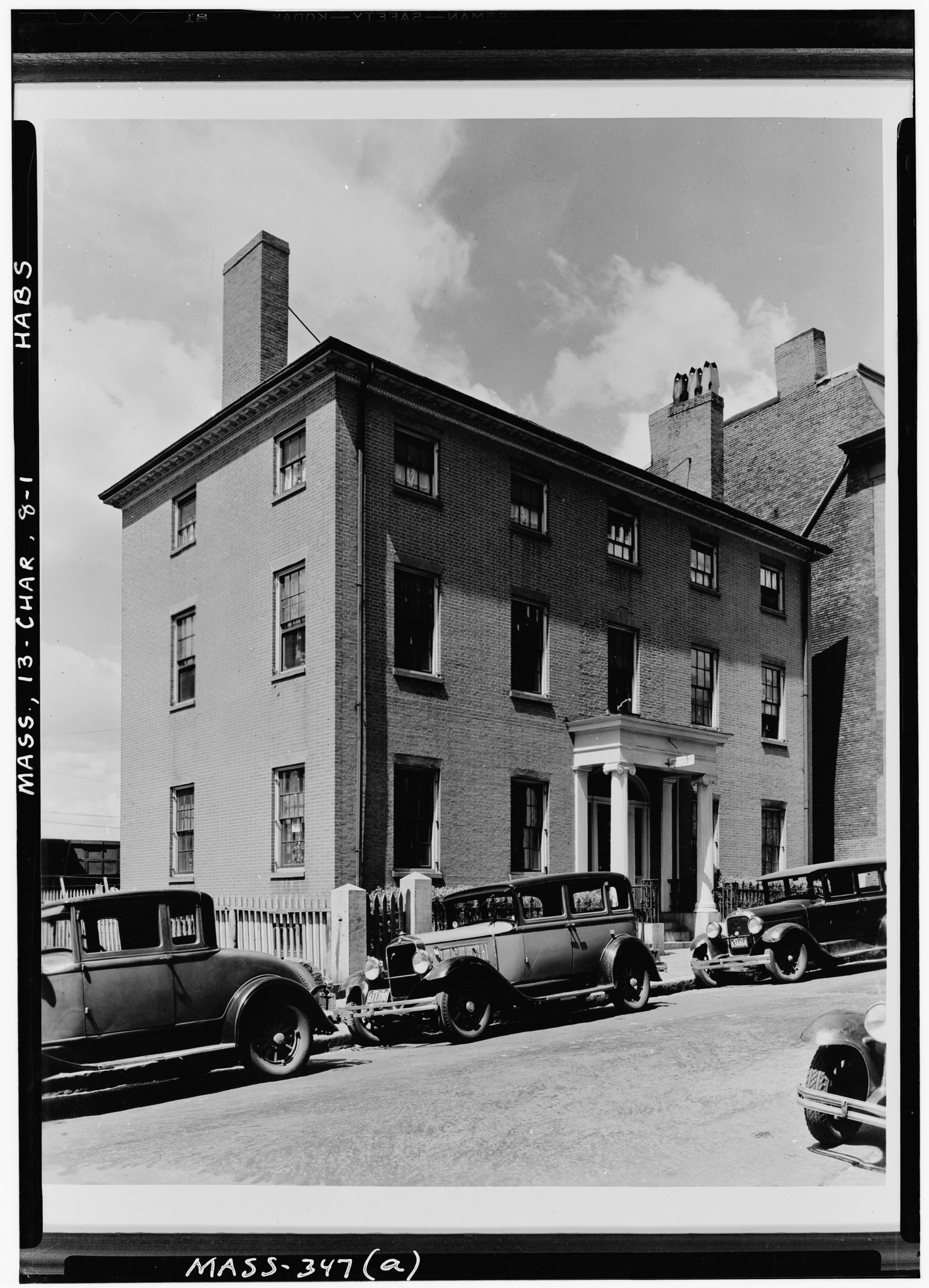
Edward Everett House

The Edward Everett House, located at 16 Harvard Street in Charlestown, was designated as a Boston Landmark by the Boston Landmarks Commission in 1996.

== In popular culture ==
- In the 2015 documentary film The Gettysburg Address, Edward Everett is portrayed by actor Ed Asner.
- In the 1992 alternate history novel The Guns of the South by Harry Turtledove, Edward Everett runs as the running mate to George McClellan's Independent campaign in the 1864 presidential election. The ticket comes in last in the popular votes but third in the electoral votes. They win 7.1% of the popular vote with 287,749 votes and get 10 electoral votes from the states of Delaware and New Jersey.

== Publications ==
- Everett, Edward (1814). A Defence of Christianity Against the Works of George B. English. Boston: Hilliard and Metcalf. ISBN 9780837006680. OCLC 2541810.
- Everett, Edward (1820). An Account of Some Greek Manuscripts, Procured at Constantinople in 1819 and now Belonging to the Library of the University at Cambridge. Memoirs of the American Academy of Arts and Sciences.
- Everett, Edward (1853). Orations and Speeches on Various Occasions, Volume 1. Boston: Little, Brown. OCLC 10559911.
- Everett, Edward (1850). Orations and Speeches on Various Occasions, Volume 2. Boston: Little, Brown. ISBN 9780608424361. OCLC 457720654.
- Everett, Edward (1859). Orations and Speeches on Various Occasions, Volume 3. Boston: Little, Brown. ISBN 9780722290682. OCLC 703424239.
- Everett, Edward (1868). Orations and Speeches on Various Occasions, Volume 4. Boston: Little, Brown. OCLC 703424868.
- Everett, Edward (1860). The Life of George Washington. New York: Sheldon and Company. OCLC 682585.

== See also ==
- List of American politicians with religious occupations

Manuscripts acquired by Everett in Constantinople

- Lectionary 172
- Lectionary 296
- Lectionary 297
- Lectionary 298

== Sources ==
- A Memorial of Edward Everett. Boston, MA: City of Boston. 1865. p. 9. OCLC 68749160.
- Adam, Thomas, ed. (2005). Germany and the Americas: O–Z. Santa Barbara, CA: ABC-CLIO. ISBN 978-1-85109-628-2. OCLC 61179541.
- Bell, William (1915). History of Stearns County, Minnesota, Volume 2. Chicago: H. C. Cooper, Jr. & Co. OCLC 3491958.
- Dalzell, Robert Jr. (1973). Daniel Webster and the Trial of American Nationalism, 1843–1852. Boston: Houghton Mifflin. ISBN 0-395-13998-8.
- Donald, David (2009) [1960]. Charles Sumner and the Coming of the Civil War. Naperville, IL: SourceBooks. ISBN 978-1-4022-2719-6. OCLC 374444000.
- Earle, Jonathan (2000). "Marcus Morton and the Dilemma of Jacksonian Antislavery in Massachusetts, 1817–1849". Massachusetts Historical Review. 4: 60–87. JSTOR 25081171.
- Frothingham, Paul Revere (1925). Edward Everett, Orator and Statesman. Boston: Houghton Mifflin Company. OCLC 1517736.
- Geiger, John (December 1976). "A Scholar Meets John Bull: Edward Everett as United States Minister to England, 1841–1845". The New England Quarterly. 49 (4): 577–595. doi:10.2307/364735. JSTOR 364735.
- Gregory, Caspar René (1900). Textkritik des Neuen Testaments. Leipzig: J.C. Hinrichs'sche Buchhandlung.
- Hale, Edward Everett (1911). "Everett, Edward" . In Chisholm, Hugh (ed.). Encyclopædia Britannica. Vol. 10 (11th ed.). Cambridge University Press. pp. 8–9.
- Hart, Albert Bushnell, ed. (1927). Commonwealth History of Massachusetts. New York: The States History Company. OCLC 1543273. (five volume history of Massachusetts until the early 20th century)
- Haxtun, Annie Arnoux (1998). Signers of the Mayflower Compact. Genealogical Publishing Company. ISBN 0-8063-0173-2.
- Hayward, John (1853). A Gazetteer of the United States of America. Hartford, CT: Case, Tiffany and Co. p. 653. OCLC 225587.
- Jones, Howard; Rakestraw, Donald (1997). Prologue to Manifest Destiny: Anglo-American Relations in the 1840s. Wilmington, DE: SR Books. ISBN 978-0-8420-2488-4. OCLC 243861557.
- Katula, Richard (2005). The Eloquence of Edward Everett: America's Greatest Orator. New York: Peter Lang. ISBN 978-1-4331-1029-0. OCLC 499741179.
- Kear, Lynn; Rossman, John; Parish, John (2008). The Complete Kay Francis Career Record. Jefferson, NC: McFarland. ISBN 978-0-7864-3198-4. OCLC 183392787.
- Mihalkanin, Edward (2004). American Statesmen: Secretaries of State from John Jay to Colin Powell. Westport, CT: Greenwood Press. ISBN 978-0-313-30828-4. OCLC 231993264.
- Reid, Ronald (1990). Edward Everett: Unionist Orator. New York: Greenwood Press. ISBN 978-0-313-26164-0. OCLC 20422506.
- State Street Trust Company (1912). Forty of Boston's Historic Houses. Boston. OCLC 2847254.
- Stratton, Julius; Mannix, Loretta (2005). Mind and Hand: the Birth of MIT. Cambridge, MA: MIT Press. ISBN 978-0-262-28448-6. OCLC 62873345.
- Varg, Paul (1992). Edward Everett: The Intellectual in the Turmoil of Politics. Selinsgrove, PA: Susquehanna University Press. ISBN 978-0-945636-25-0. OCLC 24319483.
- Whitter, Charles (1907). Genealogy of the Stimson Family of Charlestown, Mass. Boston: David Clapp & Son. OCLC 1745618.

U.S. House of Representatives
Preceded by Timothy Fuller	Member of the U.S. House of Representatives from Massachusetts's 4th congressional district 1825–1835	Succeeded by Samuel Hoar
Preceded by John Forsyth	Chair of the House Foreign Affairs Committee; 1827–1829	Succeeded by William S. Archer
Party political offices
Preceded by John Davis	Whig nominee for Governor of Massachusetts; 1835, 1836, 1837, 1838, 1839	Succeeded by John Davis
Preceded by Andrew J. Donelson; Whig	Constitutional Union nominee for Vice President of the United States; 1860	Party dissolved
Political offices
Preceded by Samuel Turell Armstrong; Acting	Governor of Massachusetts; 1836–1840	Succeeded by Marcus Morton
Preceded by Daniel Webster	United States Secretary of State; 1852–1853	Succeeded by William L. Marcy
Diplomatic posts
Preceded by Andrew Stevenson	United States Minister to Great Britain; 1841–1845	Succeeded by Louis McLane
Academic offices
Preceded by Josiah Quincy III	President of Harvard University; 1846–1849	Succeeded by Jared Sparks
U.S. Senate
Preceded by John Davis	U.S. Senator (Class 2) from Massachusetts; 1853–1854; Served alongside: Charles Sumner	Succeeded by Julius Rockwell
