= Benjamin F. Hallett =

American lawyer and politician, Democratic National Committee chair

United States Attorney for the District of Massachusetts
- In office 1853–1857
- Preceded by: George Lunt
- Succeeded by: Charles L. Woodbury

1st Chair of the Democratic National Committee
- In office 1848–1852
- Preceded by: Position established
- Succeeded by: Robert Milligan McLane

Personal details
- Born: December 2, 1797 Barnstable, Massachusetts, US
- Died: September 30, 1862 (aged 64) Boston, Massachusetts, US
- Resting place: Mount Auburn Cemetery
- Party: Anti-Masonic Party; Democratic Party
- Education: Brown University
- Occupation: Attorney

Benjamin Franklin Hallett (December 2, 1797 – September 30, 1862) was a Massachusetts lawyer and Democratic Party activist, most notable as the first chairman of the Democratic National Committee.

== Early life and education ==
Benjamin Franklin Hallett was born in Barnstable, Massachusetts. After graduating from Brown University in 1816, he studied law and began a journalistic career in Providence, Rhode Island. He soon moved to Boston, where he began with the Boston Advocate, shifting to the Boston Daily Advertiser in 1827. At that time he espoused the views of the Anti-Masonic Party, but when that particular group went out of fashion he switched to the Democratic Party as an enemy of Henry Clay. He joined and became a prominent member of the Suffolk County, Massachusetts bar.

== Political career ==
As a candidate for Congress in 1844 and 1848 he was defeated both times by Whig Robert C. Winthrop. In the latter race Charles Sumner was also a candidate, representing the Free-Soil Party. In 1848 he became, for four years, the first Chairman of the Democratic National Committee.

In March 1853, President Franklin Pierce appointed Hallett to succeed George Lunt for a four-year term as United States District Attorney for the District of Massachusetts. At the 1856 Democratic National Convention, Hallett was chairman of the Platform Committee.

=== Role in the splintering of the 1860 Democratic Convention ===
In 1860 he was chosen as a delegate, but skipped the Charleston, South Carolina, meeting (the convention, scheduled April 23-May 3, 1860, coincided with the death of Hallett's wife, Laura Smith Larned, of bilious fever, on May 3, 1860). Trying to regain the seat he had vacated, the convention at Baltimore voted 138 to 112 to deny Hallett the seat. He then joined the walk-out Convention that nominated John C. Breckinridge and Joseph Lane.

== Death ==
Hallett died at his home in Boston on September 30, 1862.
