= 1841 Liberty National Convention =

Liberty Party event in New York City

- 1844 presidential election
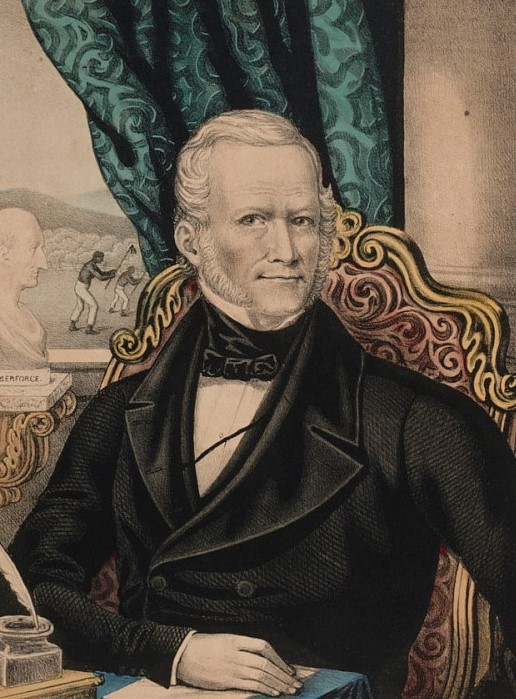
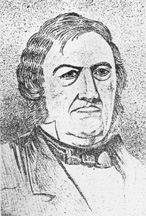
- Nominees; Birney and Morris

Convention
- Dates: May 12–13, 1841
- City: New York City
- Venue: Free Presbyterian Church
- Chair: Alvan Stewart of New York

Candidates
- Presidential nominee: James G. Birney of New York
- Vice-presidential nominee: Thomas Morris of Ohio

Voting
- Total delegates: 141
- Results (president): Birney (NY): 108 (77.14%); Abstention: 30 (20.71%); Morris (OH): 2 (1.43%); Jay (NY): 1 (0.71%)
- Results (vice president): Morris (OH): 83 (59.28%); Abstention: 37 (26.43%); Earle (PA): 18 (12.86%); Stewart (NY): 1 (0.71%)
- Ballots: 1

The Liberty Party held a presidential nominating convention on May 12 and 13, 1840, in New York City, and nominated James G. Birney of New York for president and Thomas Morris of Ohio for vice president in the 1844 United States presidential election.

Birney previously received fewer than 7,000 votes as an Independent Abolitionist in the 1840 United States presidential election. Following the election, organizers called for delegates to attend the planned 1841 gathering. More than 100 abolitionists met in the Free Presbyterian Church in New York for the party's second national convention. The delegates renominated Birney and selected Morris for the second place on the ticket, replacing Birney's 1840 running mate, Thomas Earle. The convention adopted an address outlining the party's political principles and adopted the "Liberty Party" as the organization's official name.

Party membership increased significantly during 1842 and 1843, leading to calls for a new national convention to reconsider the nominations of Birney and Morris. Ohio leaders preferred a more recognizable candidate to lead the party in the 1844 election and successfully persuaded Morris to withdraw from the ticket. The 1843 Liberty National Convention met in Buffalo, New York, but the Ohioans were unsuccessful in their appeals to the other delegates, and Birney and Morris were renominated unanimously.

== Background ==
The movement for an abolitionist political party began in Upstate New York in 1839. Interest in independent political action increased during the late 1830s following the failure of abolitionists to influence the established political parties. While consensus increasingly favored independent nominations, some abolitionists argued the time was not yet right to launch a presidential campaign, while others debated the merits of an independent candidacy versus a new political party. Garrisonian abolitionists continued to oppose participation in elections, contributing to the formal split of the American Anti-Slavery Society (AASS) in 1840.

A gathering of more than 100 delegates in Albany, New York, nominated Birney and Earle in the 1840 presidential election. The convention did not specify the name of the new party out of deference to delegates who opposed a permanent organization. Electors pledged to Birney and Earle appeared in every free state, but the ticket received fewer than 7,000 votes out of more than 2.4 million cast. Persistent partisanship, Garrisonian opposition, and lack of funds contributed to the poor showing, with Birney polling above 1 percent only in Massachusetts.

Following the election, the national correspondence committee established by the Albany convention called for delegates to attend the second national convention of the still-unnamed party. It directed supporters to choose delegates in state conventions held in January 1841 preceding the national gathering in New York City. The convention took place concurrently with the anniversary meeting of the American and Foreign Anti-Slavery Society (AFASS). The two organizations had many of the same members, including Birney, William Henry Brisbane, Joshua Leavitt, and Theodore S. Wright, who served on the AFASS's executive committee. After the original venue refused to host the AFASS, the society met in the Free Presbyterian Church on Thompson Street. At the conclusion of the meeting, Alvan Stewart announced that the presidential nominating convention would meet in the same location at 10:00 a.m. the following day.

== Candidates ==
=== Birney ===
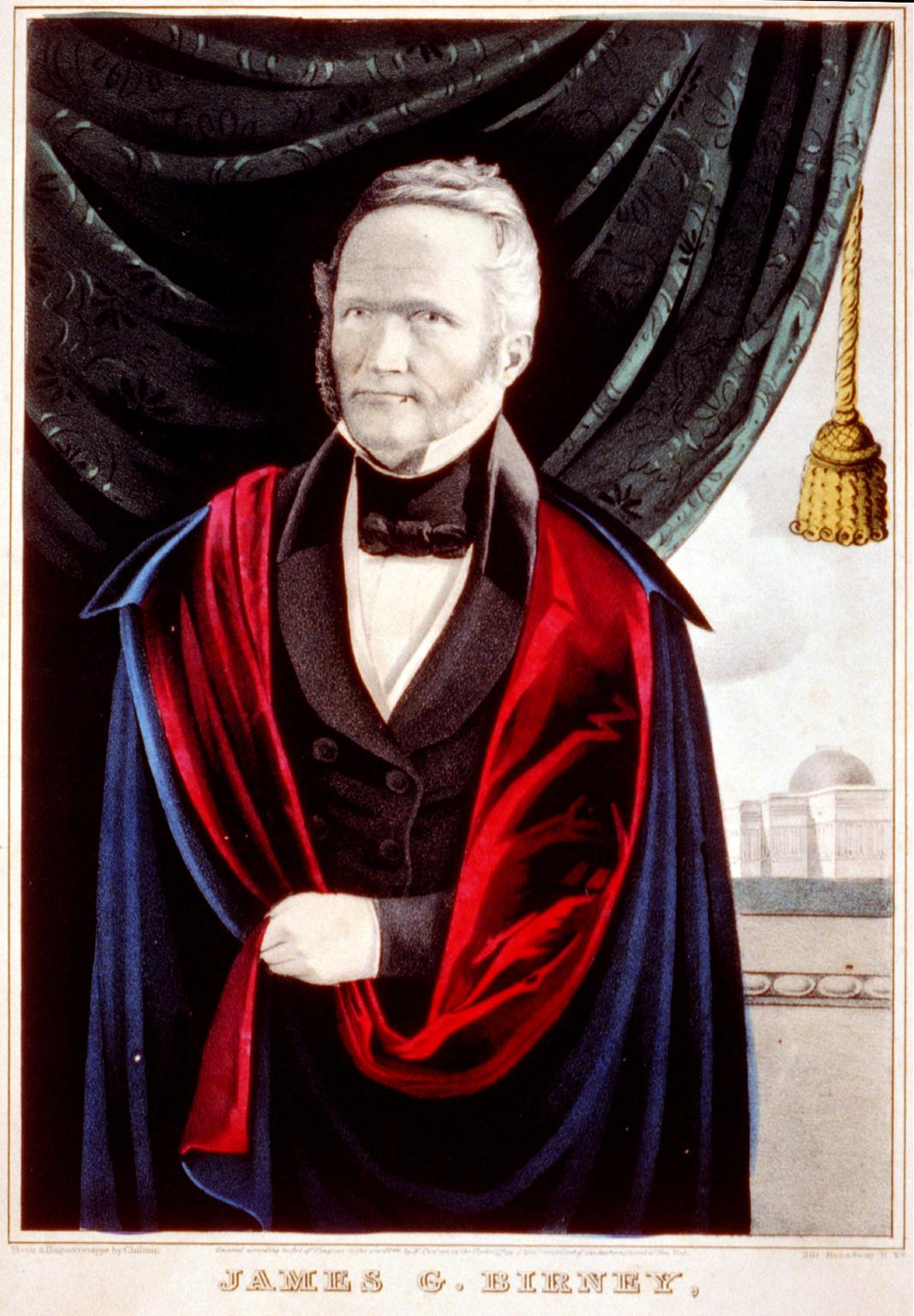
James G. Birney, twice nominated for president by the Liberty Party

James Gillespie Birney was born in 1792 to a slaveholding Kentucky family. A graduate of Princeton University, he was admitted to the bar and served as a member of both the Kentucky and Alabama legislatures during the 1810s. He was an early supporter of the American Colonization Society, which advocated for gradual emancipation and the resettlement of free people of color outside the United States. In 1836, he became a convert to immediatism, manumitted the enslaved people on his Alabama plantation, and relocated to Cincinnati, where he served as the editor of the Philanthropist and an officer in the AASS.

Birney opposed independent political action by abolitionists as late as 1838, but by 1839 had become one of the most prominent advocates for a new party. He became aligned with the Anti-Garrisonian faction in the AASS and notably broke with Garrison over the equal participation of women in the society, which Garrison supported and Birney opposed. Following the split of the AASS, Birney joined the American and Foreign Anti-Slavery Society (AFASS). After accepting the Albany convention's nomination for president in 1840, Birney traveled to London to attend the World Anti-Slavery Convention and did not return to the United States until after the election. He was the overwhelming choice of the delegates who traveled to New York City for the party's second national convention in May 1841.

=== Morris ===
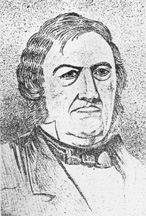
Thomas Morris, antislavery Jacksonian and vice-presidential candidate

Thomas Morris was born in Berks County, Pennsylvania, on January 3, 1776, and raised in western Virginia. In 1795, he settled in Columbia in the future state of Ohio, then part of the Northwest Territory. Under the tutelage of the Reverend John Smith, Morris became a devout Baptist and a Democratic-Republican. He established a law practice and ran successfully for the Ohio General Assembly in 1806 as an opponent of debtors' prisons, internal improvements, and government-granted monopolies, and a supporter of common schools.

Morris supported Andrew Jackson in the 1824 United States presidential election. He backed Jackson's stand against the Second Bank of the United States and ran unsuccessfully for the United States House of Representatives as a Jacksonian. Following his defeat, the General Assembly elected Morris to the United States Senate in 1832. In the Senate, Morris consistently supported Jackson throughout the Bank War and the Nullification crisis, but broke with national Jacksonians by introducing a petition supporting the abolition of slavery in the District of Columbia and voting against the federal ban on sending abolitionist literature through the mail. In his reply to the Ohio Democratic Party, Morris wrote, "I am opposed to slavery in all its forms and against its further extension in our country. ... I believe it to be the duty of the States as well as their interest, to abolish slavery where it exists." The General Assembly denied his bid for re-election in 1838; he was succeeded in the Senate by Benjamin Tappan, the brother of abolitionists Arthur and Lewis Tappan.

Following his departure from the Senate, Morris embraced more radical abolitionist views. He sent a letter supporting the Albany convention and joined the executive committee of the AFASS. Morris's use of the phrase "Slave Power" to describe the influence of proslavery interests became a staple of Liberty Party rhetoric during the 1840s.

=== Earle ===
Thomas Earle was born in Leicester, Massachusetts, in 1789 and attended Leicester Academy. He moved to Philadelphia in 1817, where he was known as a lawyer, a Jacksonian Democrat, and a Hicksite Quaker. He joined the Pennsylvania Abolition Society during the 1820s and became an officer in the AASS. Earle's support for Black suffrage at the 1837–38 Pennsylvania constitutional convention led to his expulsion from the Pennsylvania Democratic Party. He joined the movement for an abolitionist political party, a stance which placed him at odds with the Garrisonian leadership of the AASS.

Earle was nominated for vice president by the Albany convention primarily due to his past Democratic affiliation and his residence in an important swing state. He made a handful of appearances on behalf of the abolitionist ticket in Pennsylvania, but otherwise did not play a major role in the campaign. Earle's prominence in the movement declined following the election, as delegates prepared to travel to New York City for the party's second national convention.

== Leadership ==
Alvan Stewart presided over the convention. Each state delegation contributed one of the convention's 11 vice presidents: Austin Willey (Maine), Thomas Chadbourne (New Hampshire), James Dean (Vermont), Cyrus Pitt Grosvenor (Massachusetts), C. W. Turner (Rhode Island), Lewis Beers Jr. (Connecticut), C. O. Shephard (New York), John Alsop Paine (New Jersey), Isaac P. Foster (Pennsylvania), William Henry Brisbane (Ohio), and Charles Chamberlain (Indiana). Joshua Leavitt, L. P. Noble, and Levi Coffin were secretaries.

J. W. Alden, F. P. Tracy, William Goodell, William Harned, and Charles Bennett Ray served on the business committee over both days of the convention. Samuel Webb and Horace Dresser joined the committee on the morning of the second day. Following the committee's report to the convention, Stewart, Goodell, and Green were appointed to revise the draft Address to the People of the United States prior to its publication.

The convention named Stewart, Goodell, Leavitt, Beriah Green, and Edwin Weyburn Goodwin to the central corresponding committee; Stewart, as convention president, was appointed chairman. Noble, Goodwin, and R. G. Williams formed the standing financial committee.

== Convention ==
=== Nominations ===
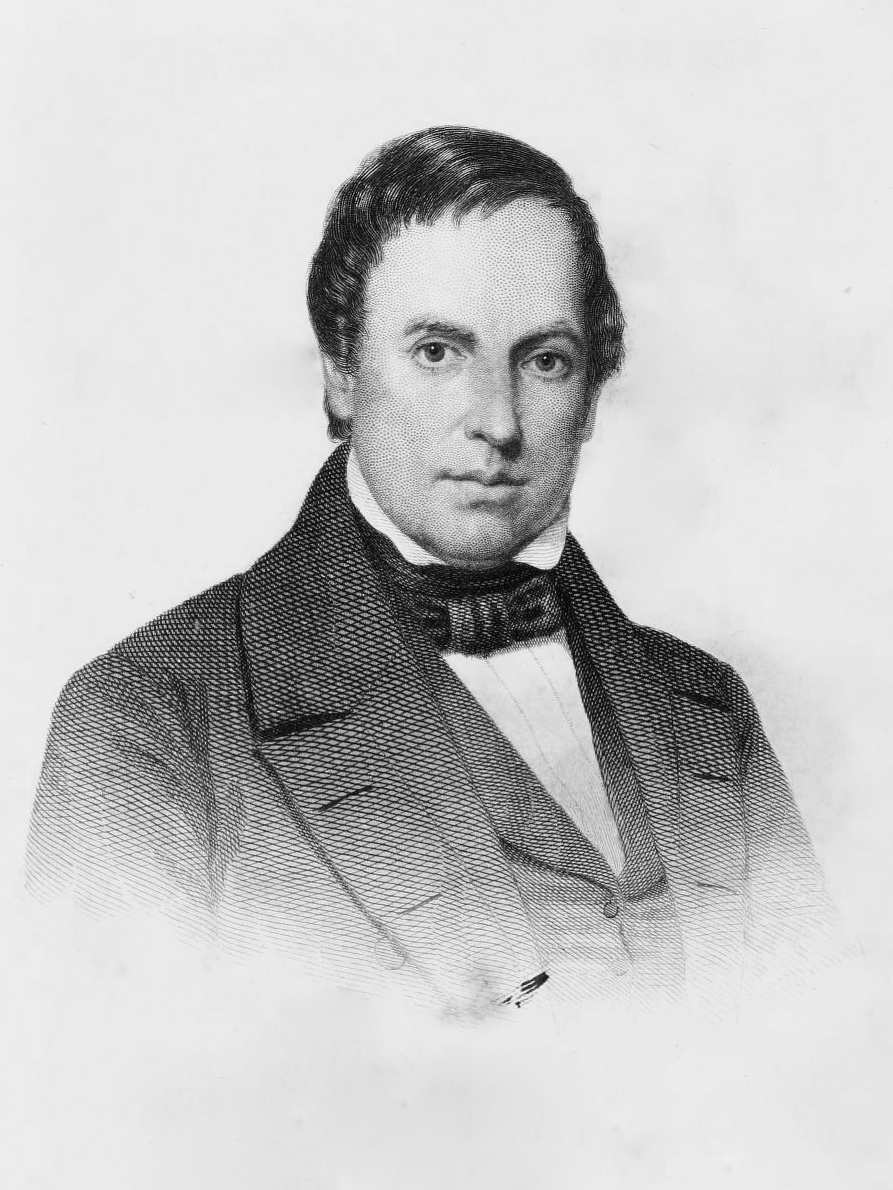
Alvan Stewart served as president of the convention.

The convention met in the church at the corner of Houston and Thompson Streets on May 12, 1840. Alvan Stewart presided. As in 1840, most of the delegates came from the Northeastern United States. Travel conditions prevented the attendance of delegates from Michigan, but representatives from Indiana and Ohio were seated. Illinois abolitionists voted not to attend and instead sent communications to the convention.

The major business item on the first day of the convention was the choice of candidates for the 1844 presidential election. Joshua Leavitt introduced a resolution declaring it "expedient" to nominate candidates for the next presidential election, which passed unanimously. Elon Galusha moved for a moment of silent worship, after which Benjamin Shaw led the convention in prayer. The delegates then proceeded to vote by ballot; Birney was nominated for president against scattering opposition, while Morris defeated Earle for the vice presidential nomination. Linneaus P. Noble moved that the nominations be made unanimous, which was accepted, and the convention adjourned until the following day.

=== Balloting ===
==== Presidential nomination ====
Candidate	Votes
James G. Birney of New York	108
Thomas Morris of Ohio	2
William Jay of New York	1
Total	111
Majority	57
Not voting	30

==== Vice presidential nomination ====
Candidate	Votes
Thomas Morris of Ohio	83
Thomas Earle of Pennsylvania	18
Gerrit Smith of New York	2
Alvan Stewart of New York	1
Total	104
Majority	53
Not voting	37

=== Party formation ===
The convention reconvened on the morning of May 13. Benjamin Shaw led the delegates in prayer. With the choice of candidates accomplished, the remaining business concerned the creation of a permanent political organization. The delegates established a central committee and approved a plan for state, county, city, district, township, and ward committees to coordinate the party's activities. They agreed that the party should contest elections at every level of government and instructed the committees to report membership statistics to the national party. Resolutions urging support for the antislavery press and coordinated action to abolish the slave trade in the United States and slavery in the District of Columbia were attached to the organizational plan.

=== Address ===
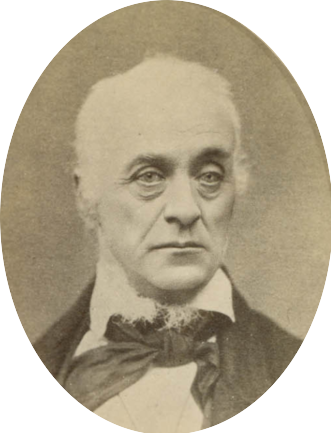
William Goodell introduced the address on behalf of the business committee.

The delegates approved an address introduced by William Goodell on behalf of the business committee outlining the party's position on slavery and participation in the electoral system. It claimed that the federal government of the United States was controlled by corrupt proslavery interests, which it called the Slave Power. In the wake of the Panic of 1837, it claimed that proslavery politicians had pursued a policy to deliberately impoverish the free states in order to maintain the political power of the economically-retrograde slave states. Both the Democratic and Whig parties were subservient to the enslavers, who manipulated the nation's trade and banking policies for their own benefit. The address represented the Slave Power as a direct threat to civil liberties in the United States and condemned violations of the human rights of enslaved people. Only through independent political action could abolitionists challenge the Slave Power's domination of the national government.

The address avoided the religious symbolism typical of political abolitionist writing in a deliberate effort to expand the party's appeal. The Slave Power thesis provided a structural critique of slavery that identified the violent exploitation of enslaved people as the source of the nation's economic, political, and moral unrest. In this analysis, enslaved people were the "greatest sufferers" under a regime that "has declared open war upon our civil, political, and religious freedoms." The nature of this critique emphasized the relevance of abolitionism beyond the point of slavery's injustice. In embracing abolition as "the great and paramount object" of the new party, the convention avoided taking a position on other national issues, which would become a source of division within the party in later years.

== Aftermath ==
The convention was the first to use the "Liberty Party" as the name of the organization. Previously, the nominees of the Albany convention ran as independent candidates in the general election. This change reflected the direction of the abolitionist movement in the 1840s, as opinion within the movement became more favorable to third-party politics.

The central committee did not meet again for two years. Membership expanded significantly during this period, as organizers from outside the original group of abolitionists joined the party. Some new members hoped that the 1843 Liberty National Convention would replace Birney with a better-known national candidate. Ohio leaders persuaded Morris to withdraw from the ticket to allow the national convention to revisit the matter, but the gathering ultimately renominated Birney and Morris unanimously.

== Bibliography ==
- Dubin, Michael J. (2002). United States Presidential Elections, 1788-1860. Jefferson, NC: McFarland & Co.
- Earle, Jonathan H. (2004). Jacksonian Antislavery and the Politics of Free Soil, 1824–1854. Chapel Hill: University of North Carolina Press.
- Foner, Eric (1995). Free Soil, Free Labor, Free Men: The Ideology of the Republican Party Before the Civil War. New York: Oxford University Press.
- Johnson, Reinhard O. (2009). The Liberty Party 1840–1848: Antislavery Third Party Politics in the United States. Baton Rouge: Louisiana State University Press. ISBN 978-0-8071-3393-4.
- Sewell, Richard H. (1976). Ballots for Freedom: Antislavery Politics in the United States, 1837–1860. New York: Oxford University Press. LCCN 75-25464.
- Wood, Nicholas (Spring 2011). "'A Sacrifice on the Altar of Slavery': Doughface Politics and Black Disenfranchisement in Pennsylvania, 1837—1838". Journal of the Early Republic. 31 (1): 75–106.
