= Ohio Central College =

College in Iberia, Ohio, United States

Coordinates: 40°40′10.2″N 82°50′32.6″W

Ohio Central College, initially known as Iberia College, was a college located in Iberia, Ohio (located fifty miles north of Columbus) in northwestern Morrow County during the second half of the 19th century. Open to all, regardless of gender or race, the college was founded by the Free Presbyterian Church and led by the Rev. George Gordon, a strong abolitionist. It counts among its alumni Warren G. Harding, a native of Morrow County and the 29th President of the United States.

== History ==
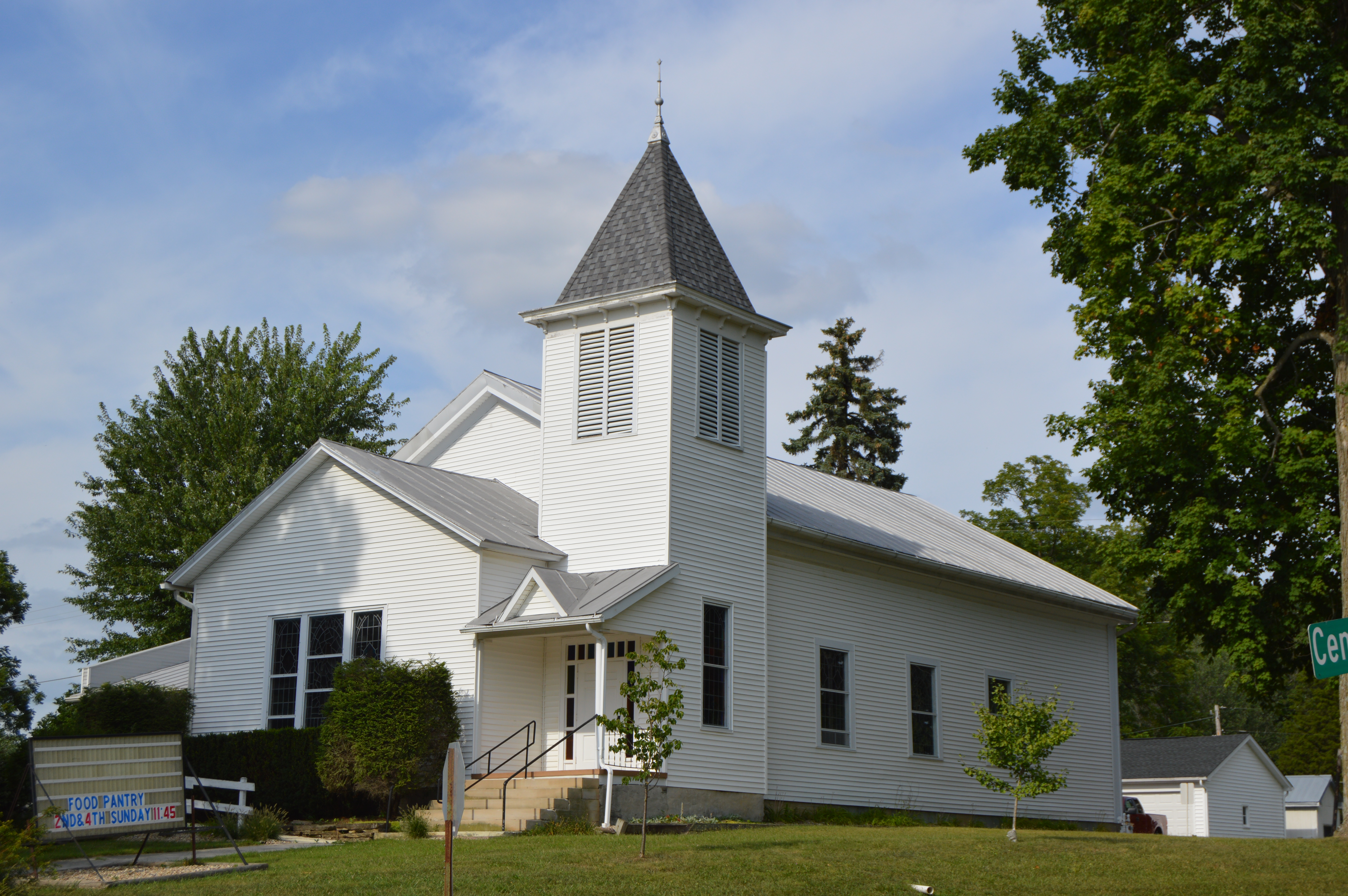
Iberia Presbyterian Church, associated with the college

In 1854, the Synod of the Free Presbyterian Church of the United States took control of about 5 acres (20,000 m^{2}) of land in Iberia on which had been a ladies' seminary. It obtained a charter to found a college from the state legislature. Iberia College was founded in 1854 with the Rev. George Gordon serving as its first president. From its beginning, the college was open to all, regardless of race or gender.

After the American Civil War, control of the college was transferred to the United Presbyterian Presbytery of Mansfield. The name of the institution was changed to Ohio Central College. Eventually, the Mansfield Presbytery transferred the college to a group organized as an independent stock company. The college continued as a Christian, though not sectarian, institution.

Towards the end of the nineteenth century, the college ended classes. The records and alumni of Ohio Central College were assumed by Muskingum College.

The campus buildings were used as a school for the blind until they burned in a fire. The only remaining structure of Ohio Central College is the Iberia Presbyterian Church, which served as the college chapel in the 1800s.

The old 19th-century college is not to be confused with a 20th-century institution of the same name.

Ohio Central Bible College was established at Iberia in 2009. It is an independent, nondenominational Bible college in the evangelical Christian tradition that was created for the people of Morrow County and the six county region. Ohio Central Bible College offers a one-year program leading to a diploma in Bible studies. Classes are currently held in the Reverend George Gordon conference room of the Iberia Presbyterian Church.

== Notable people related to the college ==
- The Rev. George Gordon, a local Presbyterian minister and abolitionist, served as the first president of the college.
- In 1882, future president Warren G. Harding graduated from the college. While a student, Harding helped create a school newspaper. He then learned about journalism while working for the Union Register in Mount Gilead, Ohio. Harding went on to own a newspaper, The Marion Star, in nearby Marion, Ohio. This paper helped serve as the launching pad for his political career, which culminated in his election as president.

== Sources ==
- History of Morrow County and Ohio, O.L. Baskin & Co., 1880.
- The Shadow of Blooming Grove, McGraw-Hill Book Company, 1968.
- History of Morrow County, Ohio, 1989, Walsworth Press, Inc., 1989.
