= 1843 Liberty National Convention =

- 1844 presidential election
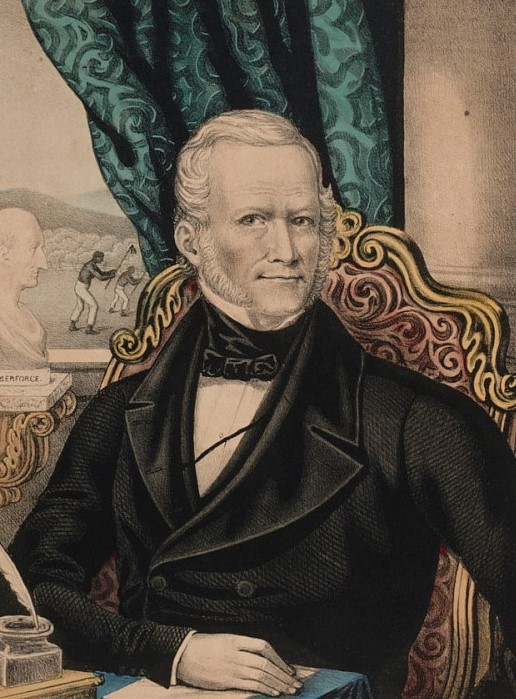
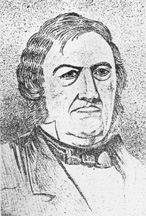
- Nominees (Birney and Morris)

Convention
- Date(s): August 30–September 1, 1843
- City: Buffalo, New York
- Venue: "Oberlin Tent" erected at Court House Park
- Chair: Leicester King of Ohio

Candidates
- Presidential nominee: James G. Birney of Michigan
- Vice-presidential nominee: Thomas Morris of Ohio

Voting
- Total delegates: 148
- Results (president): J. Birney: 108 votes T. Morris: 2 votes W. Jay: 1 vote
- Results (vice president): T. Morris: 83 votes G. Smith: 22 votes A. Stewart: 1 vote
- Ballots: 1

The 1843 Liberty National Convention was held August 30–September 1, 1843, in Buffalo, New York. It saw the Liberty Party nominate James G. Birney for president and Thomas Morris for vice president in the 1844 United States presidential election.

== Background ==
While the Liberty Party had previously held a national convention in 1841 at which they nominated James G. Birney for president and Thomas Morris as their ticket in the 1844 United States presidential election, it was decided that the party would host another convention in 1843 at which they would freshly revisit the matter of their presidential election nominees. Morris himself had indicated in early 1842 that he would decline the nomination that he had been given in 1841 due to his belief that the party should hold a fresh nominating convention at which its expanding membership could be represented.

== Logistics ==
The convention was held August 30–September 1, 1843 in Buffalo, New York. It was the second national (presidential nominating) convention of the Liberty Party. The convention was held under the so-called "Oberlin Tent" (also known as "Finney's Tent"), a large tent owned by Oberlin College. Per varying accounts, the tent was capable of accommodating up to 3,000 or 5,000 persons. For the convention, the tent was erected on the park in front of the Erie County Court House (Lafayette Square).

The convention was attended by approximately (per varying sources) 148 to 200 delegates. Newspaper reports indicated that there were delegates from the states of Connecticut, Illinois, Indiana, Kentucky, Maine, Massachusetts, Michigan, New Hampshire, New Jersey, New York, North Carolina, Ohio Pennsylvania, and Vermont.

The convention took place amid relatively nice weather in the city, and saw sizable attendance. The August 30 sessions of the convention reportedly saw a 1,300 person attendance, with approximately 300 women among them. The September 1 sessions of the convention reportedly drew a crowd of approximately 1,500.

=== Convention officers ===
Convention officers were appointed on the first day of the convention. Officers of the convention included:

- Convention president: Leicester King of Ohio
- Convention vice presidents and secretaries:
  - William H. Burleigh of Connecticut
  - Charles V. Dyer of Illinois
  - Samuel Fessenden of Maine
  - Timothy B. Hudson of Ohio
  - Titus Hutchinson of Vermont
  - William Jackson of Massachusetts
  - Samuel Lewis of Ohio
  - Thomas C. Love of New York
  - Y. O. Lovejoy of Illinois
  - Samuel McFarlane of Pennsylvania
  - L. P. Noble of New York
  - Charles B. Ray of New York
  - Elzur Wright of Massachusetts
- Resolutions Committee chair: Salmon P. Chase of Ohio

== Presidential nomination ==
Two letters were read to the convention, proceeding its nomination vote. One was from James G. Birney of Michigan (the party's nominee in the previous election), who urged the convention to nominate him for a second consecutive presidential election. The second was from William Jay, who declined any interest in accepting a nomination.

Birney secured the nomination on the first ballot, receiving 108 votes. The nomination was then made unanimous.

Presidential votes (first ballot)

- James G. Birney: 108 votes
- Thomas Morris: 2 votes
- William Jay: 1 vote

== Vice presidential nomination ==
The convention nominated Thomas Morris of Ohio for vice president on the first ballot. The nomination was then made unanimous.

Vice presidential votes (first ballot)

- Thomas Morris: 83 votes
- Gerrit Smith: 22 votes
- Alvan Stewart: 1 vote

== Platform ==
The party adopted a platform at its convention. The platform featured 21 resolutions.

== Speakers ==
Notable speakers included:

- Stephen S. Foster
- Edwin Nevin of Ohio
- Stephen Symonds Foster
- Samuel Ringgold Ward of New York

September 1 afternoon session speakers

- Henry Highland Garnet of New York
- Abby Kelley of Massachusetts
- Alvan Stewart of New York
- Charles Turner Torrey of New York

September 1 evening session speakers

- John L. Brown of Maine
- William P. Fessenden of Maine
- Elon Galusha of New York
- John Pierpont of Massachusetts
- Samuel Lewis of Ohio
