= Liberty Party (United States, 1840) =

19th century abolitionist political party

- Leader: James G. Birney; Gerrit Smith; Salmon P. Chase; William Goodell
- Founded: 1840; 186 years ago
- Dissolved: 1857; 169 years ago
- Succeeded by: Free Soil Party (majority); Radical Abolitionist Party (minority)
- Newspaper: The National Era; The Philanthropist; The Emancipator; Chicago Western Citizen
- Ideology: Abolitionism
- Senate: 1 / 58 (1846–47, peak) (Note: Joseph Cilley representing New Hampshire)
- House of Representatives: 1 / 230 (1847–49, peak) (Note: Amos Tuck representing NH-01)
- Free state lower chambers: 31 / 1,717 (1846, peak)

The Liberty Party was an abolitionist political party in the United States before the American Civil War. The party experienced its greatest activity during the 1840s, while remnants persisted as late as 1860. It supported James G. Birney in the presidential elections of 1840 and 1844. Others who attained prominence as leaders of the Liberty Party included Gerrit Smith, Salmon P. Chase, Henry Highland Garnet, Henry Bibb, and William Goodell. They attempted to work within the federal system created by the United States Constitution to diminish the political influence of the Slave Power and advance the cause of universal emancipation and an integrated, egalitarian society.

In the late 1830s, the antislavery movement in the United States was divided between Garrisonian abolitionists, who advocated nonresistance and anti-clericalism and opposed any involvement in electoral politics, and Anti-Garrisonians, who increasingly argued for the necessity of direct political action and the formation of an anti-slavery third party. At a meeting of the American Anti-Slavery Society in May 1840, the Anti-Garrisonians broke away from the Old Organization to form the American and Foreign Anti-Slavery Society. The New Organization included many political abolitionists who gathered in upstate New York to organize the Liberty Party ahead of the 1840 elections. They rejected the Garrisonian singular emphasis on moral suasion and asserted that abolitionists should oppose slavery by all available means, including by coordinating at the ballot box.

The party attracted support from former Whigs and Jacksonian Democrats alienated by their parties' proslavery national leaderships, as well as the early involvement of women and African Americans. Internal disagreements over whether and how the party should cooperate with abolitionists who remained within the two major parties and to what extent Liberty candidates should address issues beyond slavery intensified after 1844. In 1847 party leaders favoring a coalition with antislavery Conscience Whigs and Barnburner Democrats succeeded in nominating John P. Hale for president over Gerrit Smith, the candidate of the radical Liberty League. Hale was an Independent Democrat who had opposed the gag rule in Congress and voted against the annexation of Texas but stopped short of endorsing immediate emancipation. Following the 1848 convention of antislavery politicians at Buffalo, New York, Hale withdrew from the race in favor of Martin Van Buren, and most of the Liberty Party folded into the larger Free Soil Party. Smith and the Liberty League continued to maintain a separate organization and supported an independent ticket in each ensuing election until 1860. Many former Liberty leaders subsequently became founders of the Republican Party, including Salmon Chase.

== History ==
=== Creation, 1839–41 ===
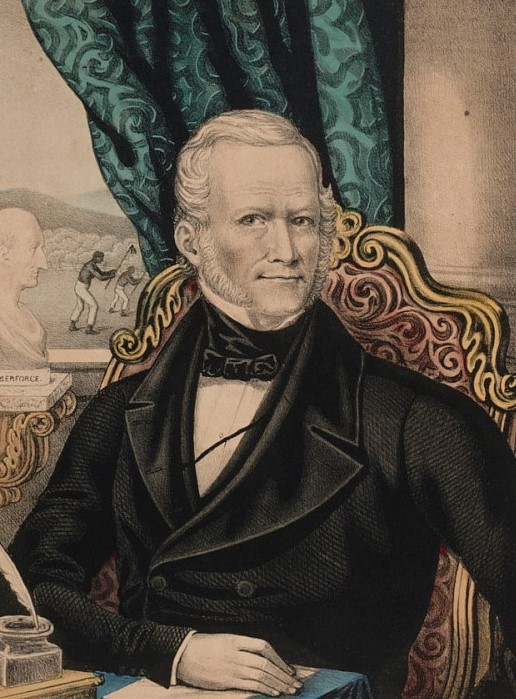
James G. Birney, Liberty Party leader and candidate for president in 1840 and 1844.

Efforts by abolitionists to organize politically began in the late 1830s. The earliest attempts were not made with a new party in mind, as abolitionists hoped to influence the two existing parties. Antislavery voters in New England demanded candidates announce their position on slavery and awarded or withheld their support accordingly. The success of the "questioning system" proved fleeting, however, as abolitionists discovered candidates frequently would issue antislavery pledges during a campaign, only to abandon their commitments once elected. As party organizations resumed their place as the drivers of national politics after 1828, the need for a dedicated antislavery party to effectively oppose the bipartisan proslavery consensus gradually gained recognition. After 1837, the Democratic Party leadership sought actively to expel antislavery Jacksonians such as Thomas Morris and John P. Hale whose principled opposition to slavery was seen as a threat to party unity. While the Whig Party sometimes sought to ingratiate itself with abolitionists, the influence of southern nullifiers and proslavery northern Cotton Whigs prevented the party from taking a strong antislavery stance. Committed to the union of the states, both parties sought to suppress issues such as slavery which threatened to split the country along sectional lines.

The overwhelming hostility of the established parties encouraged a growing opinion in abolitionist circles favoring creation of an independent antislavery party. The first movement toward this object took place at Warsaw, New York, at an abolitionist meeting led by Myron Holley, formerly one of the commissioners of the Erie Canal. The assembly nominated James G. Birney for president and called for a national convention of political abolitionists to meet at Albany, New York, to organize the new party. The Albany convention was attended by 121 delegates from six states who nominated Birney for president and Thomas Earle for vice president on April 1, 1840. The initial response to the Albany convention was lukewarm; while the Garrisonians continued to oppose any involvement in electoral politics, others felt the nominations were premature and that the political abolitionists needed more time to persuade their colleagues of the necessity of independent political action for the new party to be successful. Nevertheless, electoral tickets pledged to Birney and Earle were organized in every free state. Concerns that the party was still too young to attract the support of most abolitionists proved warranted. Birney polled fewer than 7,000 votes in the 13 states where there were electors pledged to him; in four of these (Connecticut, Indiana, New Jersey, and Rhode Island), he received fewer than 100 votes. He received no votes from the slave states, where the party had not been organized. The Whig ticket of William Henry Harrison and John Tyler was elected with 234 electoral votes to 60 for the incumbent Democrat Martin Van Buren; Harrison's share of the vote in the free states (52.42%) dwarfed Birney's less than one percent showing.

The party initially went by a number of different names, including the Human Rights Party, the Abolition Party, and the Freemen's Party. The 1841 Liberty National Convention selected the "Liberty Party" as the movement's official name.

=== Rise, 1841–43 ===
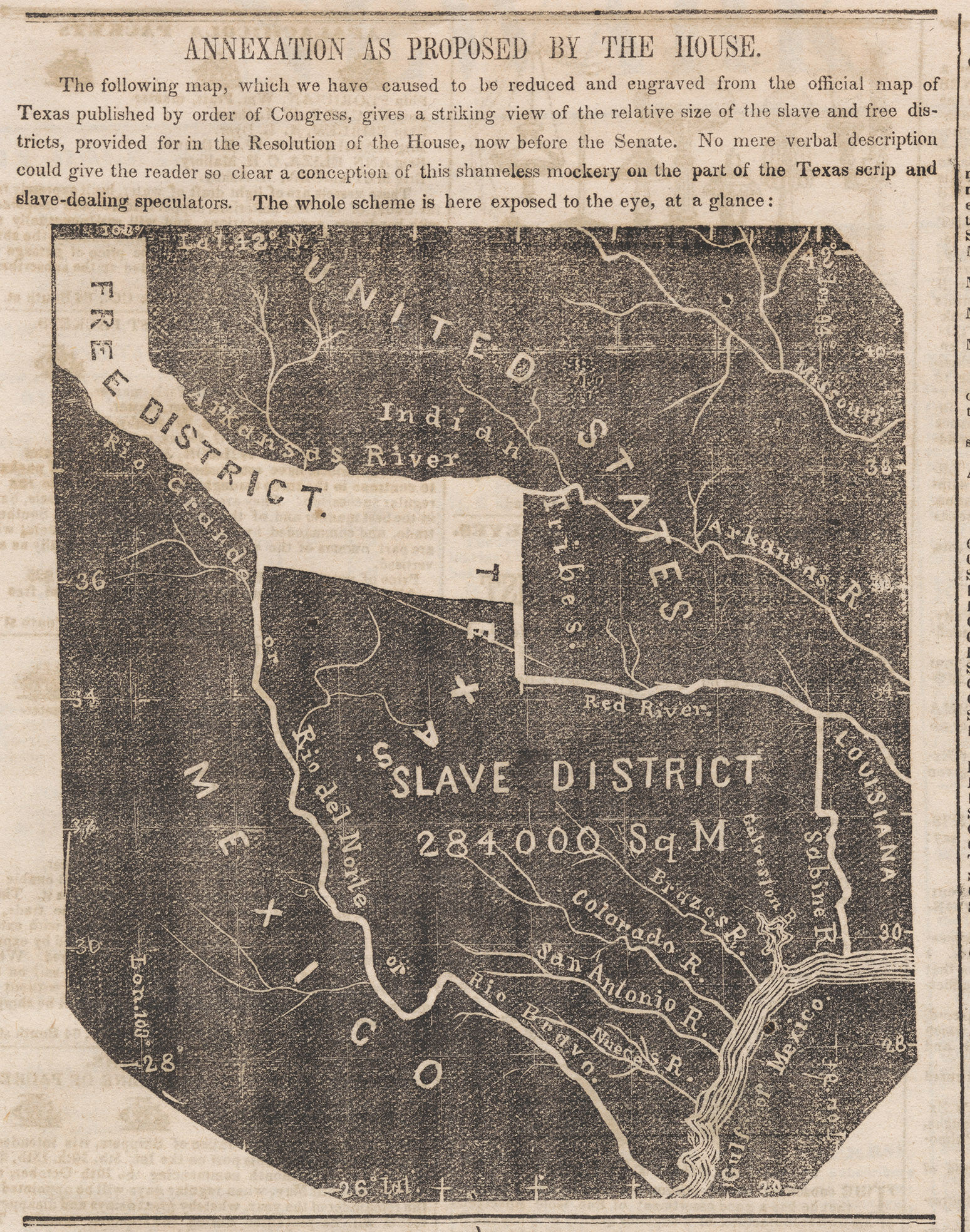
A map published by the Newark Daily Advertiser opposing the annexation of Texas.

The Liberty Party experienced rapid growth in the years following the 1840 United States elections, particularly in New England and areas of Yankee settlement. Events in Washington helped drive support for antislavery politics. In April 1841, Harrison died and was succeeded by Vice President Tyler, who became the 10th president of the United States. A Virginian and a slaveholder, Tyler was one of the southern conservatives who joined the Whig Party after 1834 to oppose the expansion of executive power under Andrew Jackson. Tyler broke with Whig congressional leaders over the proposal to recharter the Bank of the United States, leading to his exit from the Whig Party before the end of 1841; significantly for abolitionists, he was an early and ardent advocate of the annexation of Texas. Tyler believed American acquisition of Texas was necessary to secure the future of slavery in the United States; he, along with Secretary of State John C. Calhoun, feared that if Texas became aligned with the British Empire, it would become a haven for freedom seekers and weaken slavery in the Lower South. Abolitionists drew similar conclusions and opposed Texas annexation as a measure likely to increase the political might of the Slave Power. The Tyler-Texas Treaty drew opposition from moderate antislavery congressmen as well, including Hale and Benjamin Tappan. As northern opposition to annexation mounted, the indecision of the Whigs and Democrats increased the attractiveness of the Liberty Party to antislavery voters as the only principled anti-annexation party.

Between 1841 and 1843, abolitionist opinion shifted perceptibly in favor of independent political action, and the Liberty Party was the recipient of this outpouring of support. While William Lloyd Garrison remained a prominent and influential figure, the failure of moral suasion discredited the approach of the AASS, and by 1844, "the Liberty Party was the major vehicle for serious abolitionist sentiment in every state." This support translated to scattered successes in local and state legislative races in areas where abolitionists were an organized and active majority of voters. Elsewhere, Liberty voters could play kingmaker in areas where neither opposing party controlled a majority of the electorate. In the highly competitive and closely divided environment of the Second Party System, even a modest showing for the Liberty candidates could have deep and lasting effects. Six Liberty members were elected to the Massachusetts General Court in 1842, where they held the balance of power in the divided legislature. That year, Samuel Edmund Sewall polled 5.4 percent as the Liberty candidate for governor, enough to hold both leading candidates below a majority and send the election to the Massachusetts Senate. The strategy of the Liberty members to leverage their votes to produce a deadlock narrowly failed when one Whig member voted with the Democrats to ensure the abolitionists' defeat, and John Greenleaf Whittier wrote that Sewall "came within a hair's breadth of being governor."

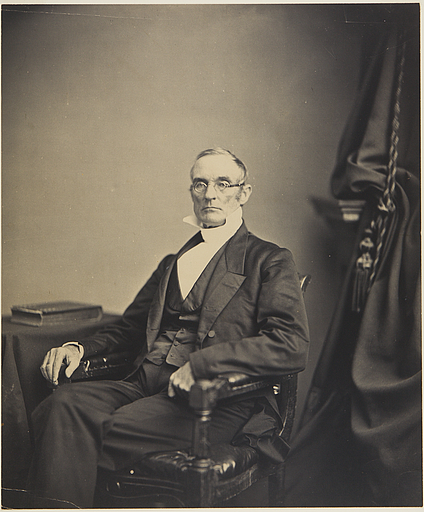
Joshua Leavitt, influential editor of The Emancipator and an anti-coalitionist.

The 1842 campaign in Massachusetts raised significant questions in the internal debate over party strategy. Most Liberty members conceived of the party as a moral crusade to purify American politics from the corrupting influence of the Slave Power. They had renounced their past party allegiances in the belief that the established parties were institutionally committed to slavery and therefore incapable of being converted to abolitionist principles. Many disavowed any cooperation with the established parties, even when local candidates had proven antislavery records. While Independent Democrats like Hale and Conscience Whigs like John Quincy Adams and Joshua Reed Giddings might share some abolitionist priorities, they would still campaign for their parties' proslavery national candidates and did not support immediate, universal emancipation. Editors like Joshua Leavitt of The Emancipator and James Caleb Jackson of the Utica Liberty Press argued that helping to elect such "major party" opponents of slavery ultimately strengthened the Slave Power by extending the life of the established proslavery parties; they called for the Liberty Party to remain an independent organization and work to defeat the proslavery parties outright. Another faction, based in Ohio, sought a coalition with antislavery Whigs and Democrats. Led by Salmon P. Chase and Gamaliel Bailey, they aimed to broaden the party's appeal beyond the abolitionist movement by emphasizing opposition to slavery's extension and the negative effects of slavery for white northerners.

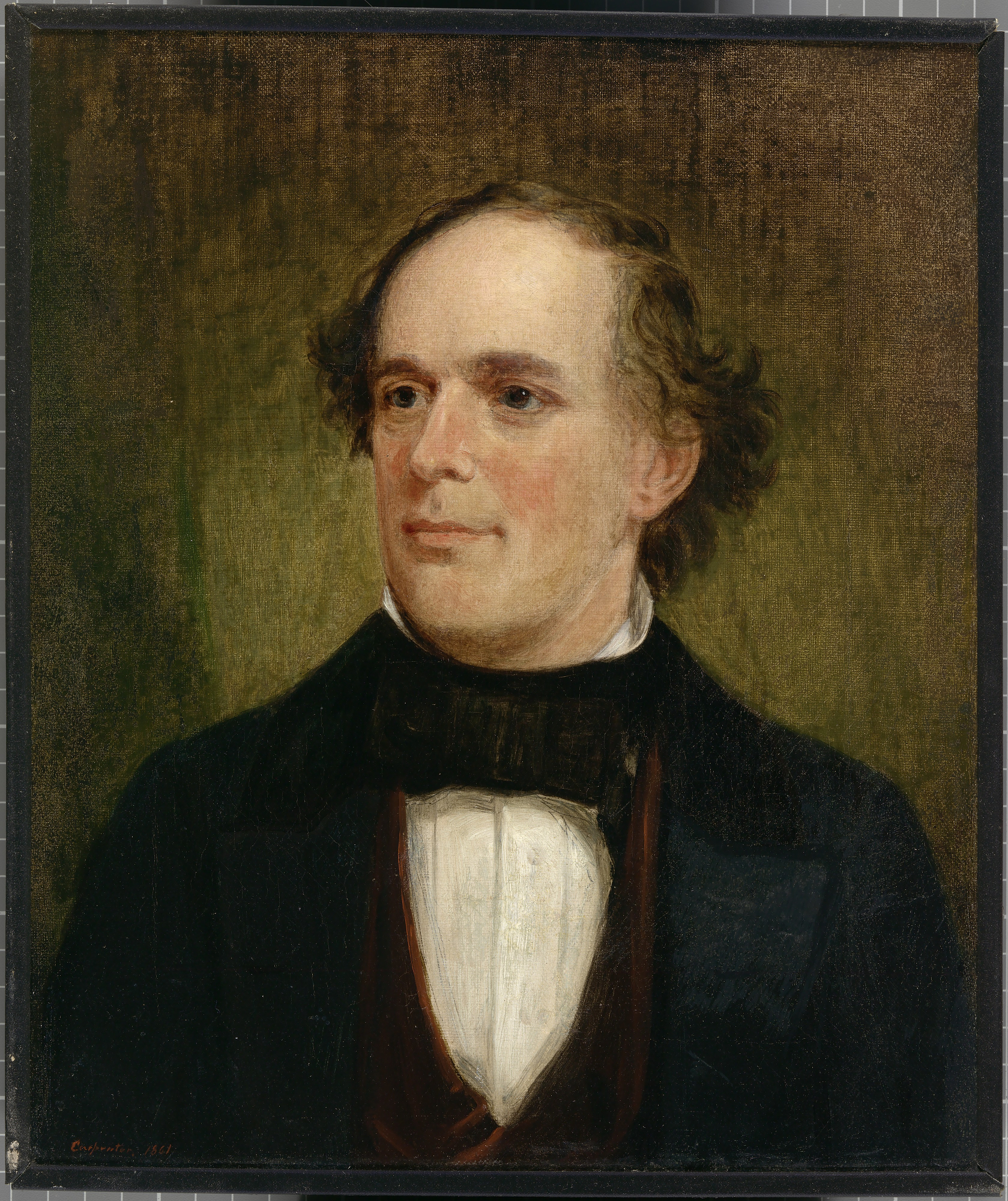
Salmon P. Chase, future chief justice and author of the 1843 Liberty Party platform.

Strategic disagreements between Leavitt and Chase threatened to divide the party in the approach to the 1844 presidential election. The 1841 national convention had nominated Birney for president and Thomas Morris for vice president. Chase hoped to recruit a nationally prominent politician such as Adams, New York Governor William Seward, or Judge William Jay to head the Liberty ticket, and wrote to Birney suggesting that he withdraw from the race. The suggestion offended Birney and enraged Leavitt. Henry B. Stanton, who supported Birney, reported that many in the Massachusetts Liberty Party preferred Jay, including Sewall and Whittier. When the Liberty National Convention met at Buffalo, New York, in August 1843, however, Birney and Morris were nominated unanimously. The platform adopted by the Buffalo convention showed Chase's influence. Conceding that the United States Congress lacked the authority to abolish slavery directly, it demanded the "absolute and unqualified divorce" of the federal government from slavery: abolition of slavery in the territories, repeal of the gag rule, and voiding the Fugitive Slave Clause and other proslavery provisions of the United States Constitution. In this way, the platform writers hoped to contain and ultimately suffocate slavery. The platform sharply criticized the abridgement of states' rights and civil liberties in cases such as Prigg v. Pennsylvania that upheld the Fugitive Slave Act of 1793. It attacked the proslavery bias of the national government and demanded "the example and influence of national authority ought to be arrayed on the side of liberty and free labor."

The Liberty Party has not been organized merely for the overthrow of slavery; its first decided effort must, indeed, be directed against slave-holding as the grossest and most revolting manifestation of despotism, but it will also carry out the principle of equal rights into all its practical consequences and applications, and support every just measure conducive to individual and social freedom.

=== Crisis, 1844–47 ===
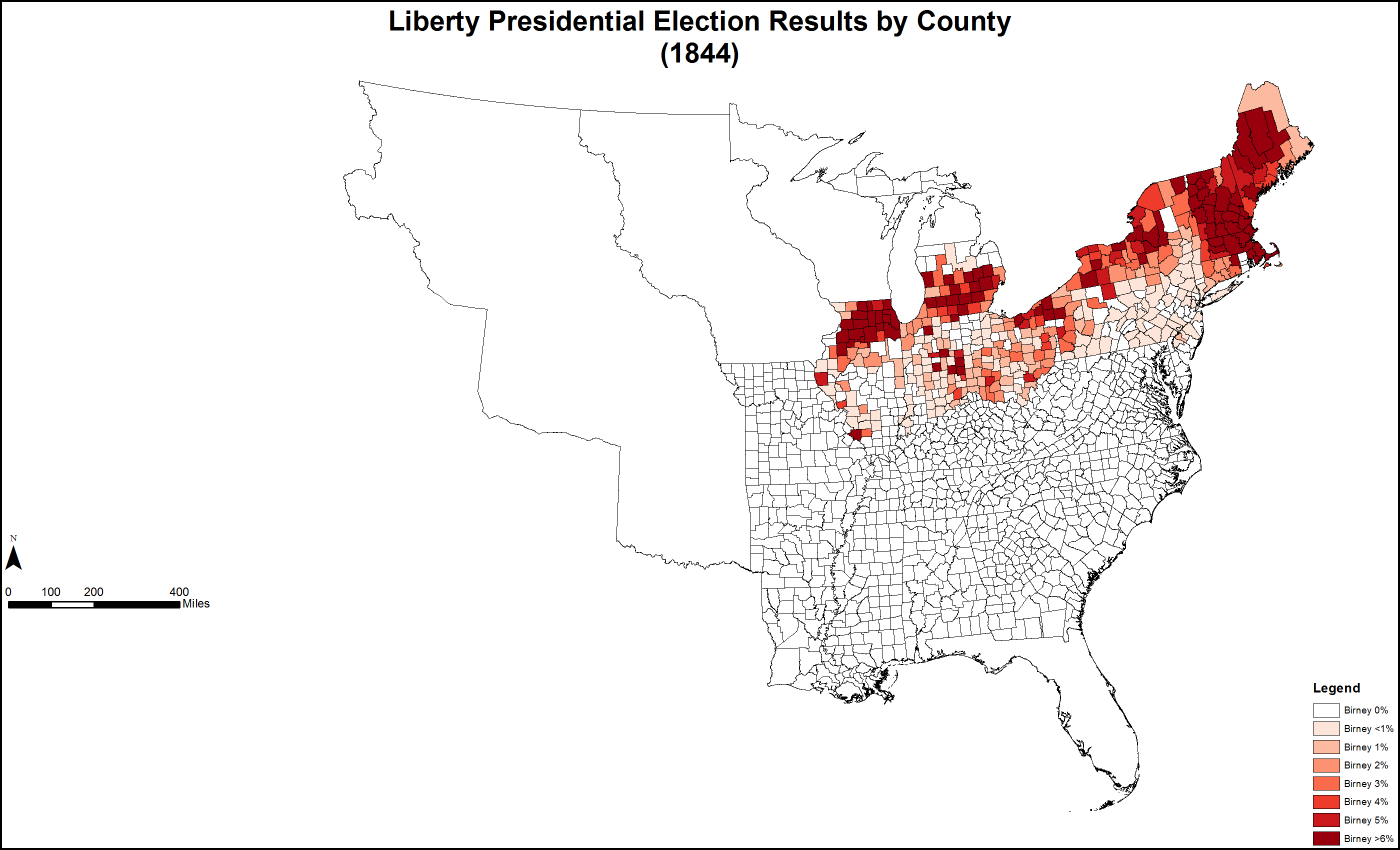
Liberty Party share of the vote by county in the 1844 presidential election.

Birney received 62,000 votes in the free states, a nearly tenfold increase over his 1840 result. In five states (Maine, Massachusetts, Michigan, New Hampshire, and Vermont), his share of the total vote exceeded five percent. He received no votes in the slave states. The major issue in the campaign was the annexation of Texas. Martin Van Buren, the early presumptive nominee of the Democratic Party, opposed annexation on the grounds that it would inflame sectional tensions between the free and slave states. This position cost him the support of the southern Democrats, and James K. Polk was nominated for president on a pro-annexation platform. Henry Clay, the candidate of the Whigs, assumed an ambivalent stance on Texas in an effort to hold together his party's fracturing coalition. He initially opposed annexation, then supported it late in the campaign, only to subsequently clarify that he favored annexation only if it could be achieved without war with Mexico. Abolitionists mistrusted Clay because of his status as a slaveholder as well as his previous interactions with the abolitionist movement. In a campaign visit to Richmond, Indiana, in 1842, Clay angrily denounced a group of Quakers who called on him to manumit his slaves. He distanced himself from his cousin Cassius Clay, a prominent antislavery editor, and repeatedly attacked the abolitionist movement as divisive and incendiary. A popular abolitionist song, published in 1844, included the lines, "Railroads to emancipation, / Cannot rest on Clay foundation." Polk won the election with 170 electoral votes to 105 for Clay. Polk carried New York and Michigan with less than a majority; if the Liberty voters in these states had all voted for Clay, Clay would have gained both states and thus the presidency. This has led some historians to suggest that the Liberty Party was a spoiler in 1844, diverting votes that would otherwise have gone to Clay. However, a substantial minority of Liberty voters in 1844 (including vice presidential candidate Thomas Morris) were former Democrats and had no love for Clay. Liberty Party leaders such as Chase and Gerrit Smith aligned more closely with the Jacksonians on national issues apart from slavery, and Birney himself accepted the Democratic nomination for a seat in the Michigan Legislature while running as the Liberty candidate for president. Reinhard Johnson notes that most Liberty voters considered the Whigs no less proslavery that the Democrats and likely would not have voted for Clay in any case. Birney's result in 1844 was consistent with or slightly reduced from the Liberty Party's showing in the 1843 state elections, suggesting ex-Whig support for Birney represented voters who had abandoned Clay long before the 1844 campaign.

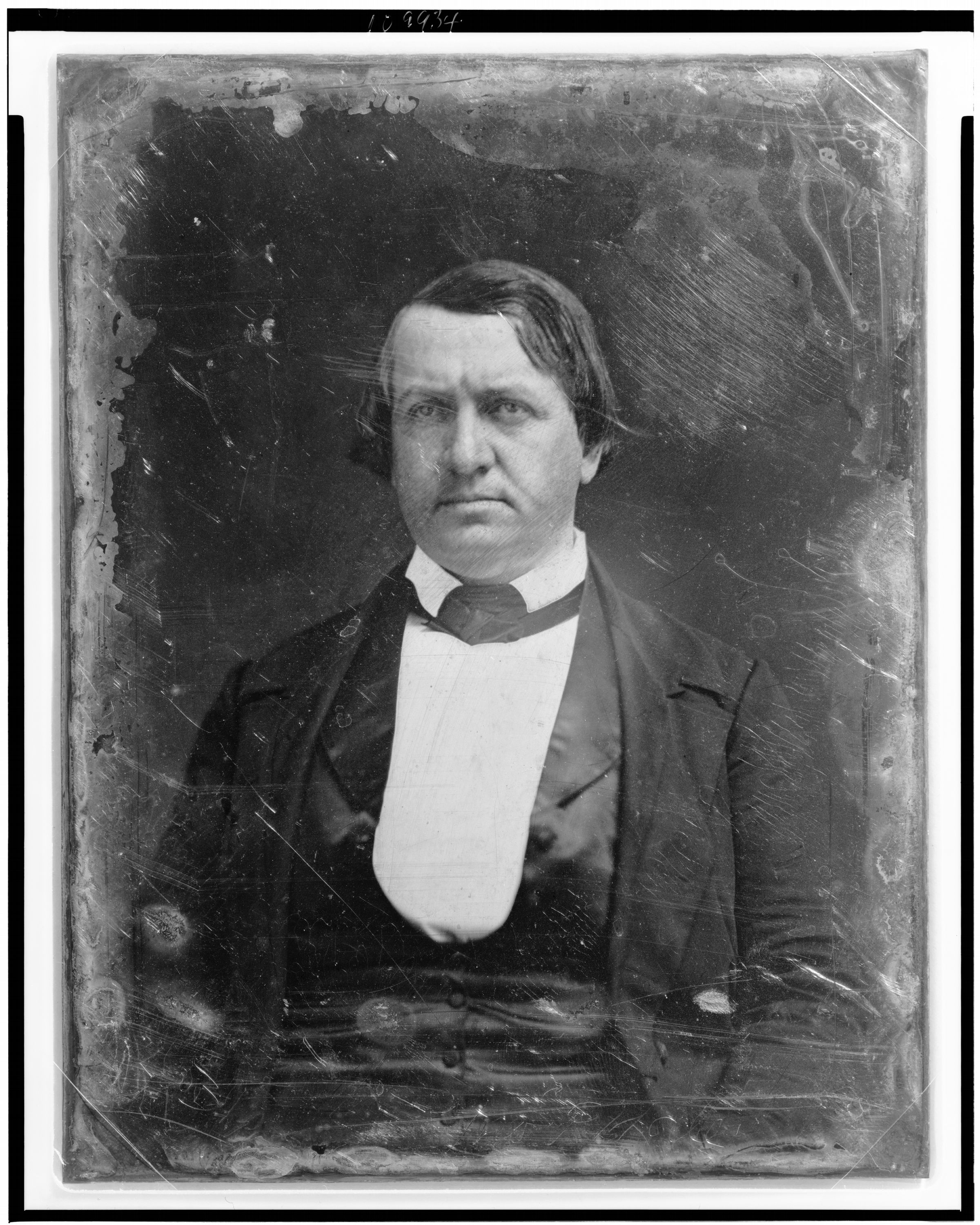
Senator John P. Hale of New Hampshire, the original nominee of the Liberty Party for president in 1848.

Birney's defeat reopened the debate over strategy that had troubled the party in 1843. While Birney improved substantially on his result from 1840, his showing compared less favorably to more recent Liberty Party performances in state and local elections. Birney had damaged his credibility by accepting the Democratic nomination for the Michigan Legislature, which allowed Whigs to portray him as a stooge for the Democrats. In the aftermath of the election, Chase and Bailey redoubled their calls for cooperation among antislavery men of all parties. This strategy was most successful in New Hampshire, where in 1846 a coalition of antislavery Whigs, Democrats, and Liberty men won a majority in the legislature. They elected Hale to the United States Senate, where he served as an Independent Democrat. Another group, including Smith and William Goodell, continued to eschew cross-party cooperation. Instead, they proposed that the Liberty Party should embrace other popular reform causes in order to appeal to a broader swath of the electorate. This group organized the Liberty League to promote their platform and candidates within the Liberty Party. The core disagreement between these two groups was whether Liberty members should consider themselves a "temporary" or "permanent" party. Chase, Bailey, Stanton, and Whittier saw the party as a temporary organization whose role was to initiate a political realignment, with Liberty members joining antislavery Whigs and Democrats in a new, broad-tent anti-extension party. Smith, Goodell, Leavitt, and Birney, meanwhile, insisted that the Liberty Party was a permanent project whose objective was to defeat rather than convert the two established parties.

Increasingly, some Liberty members began to articulate an antislavery legal theory at odds with the accepted Garrisonian interpretation of the Constitution. Garrison, who memorably described the Constitution as "a covenant with death" and "an agreement with Hell," held it to be a proslavery document that committed the national government to slavery's defense. The 1843 Liberty platform accepted this argument in part, demanding the "divorce" of the national government from slavery, but conceding that Congress lacked the authority to abolish slavery directly. After 1844, Liberty leaders including Smith and Goodell began to argue that the Constitution was in fact antislavery and had been wrongly construed by proslavery judges and elected officials. Lysander Spooner claimed that slavery had been abolished by the Declaration of Independence and that its continuance after 1776 was unlawful. The antislavery interpretation of the Constitution became a core position of the Liberty League; Chase and Bailey (who after 1847 served as the editor of The National Era) continued to assert slavery's constitutional status and the need for abolitionists to work within the system of states' rights.

In June 1847, the Liberty League held a convention at Macedon, New York. The delegates nominated Smith for president and Elihu Burritt for vice president. Birney, Lydia Child, and Lucretia Mott also received votes for president. The purpose of the convention was not to organize a new party, but to influence the upcoming Liberty National Convention. Meanwhile, Chase was working intently to promote Hale as the candidate likeliest to attract support from antislavery voters outside the Liberty Party. Hale was an unconventional choice for most Liberty members. Many had admired his protest against the gag rule and his opposition to the annexation of Texas. He shared many of the Liberty Party's immediate goals, including the abolition of slavery in the territories. Nevertheless, Hale was not a member of the Liberty Party, nor did he call himself an abolitionist. When the Liberty Party delegates at Buffalo voted overwhelmingly to nominate Hale over Smith, it represented a victory for Chase and the coalitionists. By nominating Hale, the delegates had chosen to fight the next campaign on the narrow ground of opposition to slavery's westward extension, rather than the broader reform agenda advocated by the Liberty League. This position had the advantage of appealing to a wider range of voters than the Liberty Party had previously been able to reach. For the Liberty Leaguers, however, this represented a retreat from the broader evangelical reform spirit that had led them into the abolitionist movement. Their opposition to slavery grew out of a comprehensive ethic of social justice that opposed all forms of inequity and oppression. By nominating Hale, the Liberty Party, in their view, had surrendered its long-term social agenda for the sake of short-term political gain.

=== Fusion, 1847–48 ===
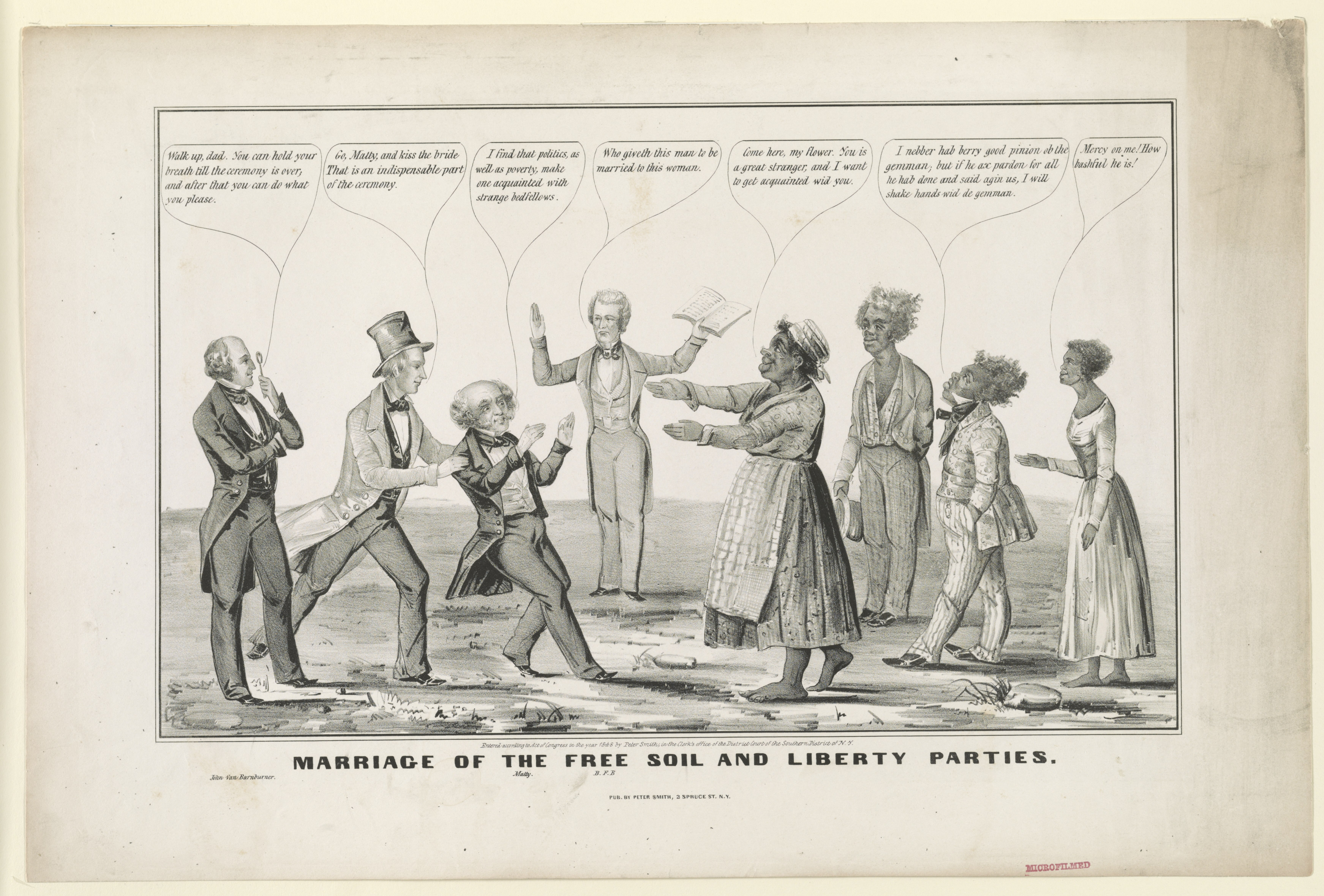
Marriage of the Free Soil and Liberty Parties, a derisive portrayal of the origins of the Free Soil Party. Martin Van Buren hesitantly steps forward to embrace a woman of color, representing the Liberty Party, as Barnburner Democrat Benjamin F. Butler officiates.

The struggle between the Liberty League and the coalitionists for control of the Liberty Party occurred as events were rapidly transforming the national context for political antislavery. Following the Mexican–American War, the United States acquired a vast tract of land in the southwest comprising the present-day states of California, Utah, Nevada, Arizona, and parts of New Mexico, Colorado, and Wyoming. Congressional efforts to organize this new territory soon became mired in controversy over the westward extension of slavery. Antislavery Whigs and Democrats united behind a proposal by David Wilmot to outlaw slavery in the entire Mexican Cession. The Wilmot Proviso easily passed the House but stalled in the Senate, where the free and slave states had equal representation. As the debate dragged on into 1848, the issue of slavery's extension promised to be the major issue in the upcoming presidential election. Once again snubbing Martin Van Buren, the Democratic National Convention nominated Lewis Cass of Michigan on a platform endorsing popular sovereignty. Clay was again a candidate for the Whigs, but the convention passed him over in favor of General Zachary Taylor. Though publicly neutral on the slavery question, Taylor was a slaveholder and a career military man who had risen to prominence in a war many northern Whigs had fervently opposed. Faced with a choice between a proslavery Democrat and a slaveholding Whig, the moment seemed ripe for a union of antislavery men of all parties like what Chase and the coalitionists had long anticipated.

The Van Buren men were the first to bolt. On June 22, a mass demonstration of Barnburner Democrats in New York City summoned delegates to Utica to nominate an antislavery Democrat to run against the nominees of the two established parties. Simultaneously, Conscience Whigs anticipating the selection of a proslavery national candidate made plans to lead their voters out of the Whig tent. With the rupture of both established party coalitions seemingly imminent, Chase quickly organized a Free Territory Convention that could provide the basis for a coordinated effort by antislavery men of all parties in opposition to the nominees of the Slave Power. Events in Philadelphia soon brought these plans to fruition. Taylor secured the Whig nomination on June 9; that evening, a group of fifteen dissident Whig delegates led by Henry Wilson met and issued the long-awaited call for a new antislavery party. The following day, the Utica Barnburner convention nominated Van Buren for president and Henry Dodge for vice president. When Dodge declined the vice presidential nomination, it opened the door for the Barnburners to join the emerging Free Soil coalition. Representatives of the three factions met at Buffalo on August 9, 1848, to organize the national Free Soil Party and nominate candidates for president and vice president. Approximately 20,000 men and women were in attendance at the convention, which lasted two days. Hale was still the preferred choice of most Liberty members, but the importance of the Barnburners—by far the largest element of the coalition—required Van Buren be the presidential candidate. Conscience Whig Charles Francis Adams Sr., the son of the late John Quincy Adams, was nominated for vice president. Hale promptly withdrew from the presidential race, and the large majority of the Liberty Party was subsumed into the Free Soil movement.

The platform of the Free Soil Party was notably more conservative than earlier Liberty Party documents. It confined itself to opposing the extension of slavery into new states and expressly denied the authority of Congress to abolish slavery where it already existed. This, so far, was consistent with the position of the Liberty Party in 1844; but the Free Soil Party rejected the racial egalitarianism of the Liberty Party and the antislavery construction of the Fifth Amendment for which Chase had argued persistently over the previous decade. It embraced traditional Democratic economic policies many in the Liberty Party had long supported, including a federal homestead act. These points were wholly insufficient for the Liberty League, who revived Gerrit Smith's candidacy under the banner of the reconstituted Liberty Party. An ad hoc national convention held at Buffalo nominated Smith and Charles C. Foote on a platform embracing the radical implications of the Liberty League's "one idea" philosophy. Declaring themselves unalterably committed to the cause of human freedom and the destruction of all arbitrary distinctions of race, class, and gender, they endorsed the extension of universal suffrage, temperance, land reform, the abolition of the army and navy, and a general boycott of all consumer goods connected with slavery. They expressed solidarity with the French Revolution of 1848 and the recent escape attempt by 177 enslaved people in Washington, D.C.

County-level results of the 1848 presidential election. The Free Soil Party carried several counties in the Upper North and finished second in three states. The rump Smith/Foote ticket did not win any counties.

Almost all Liberty members, however, eventually followed Joshua Leavitt into the Free Soil Party. Early successes in Upper New England encouraged hopes for a political earthquake, as the Free Soilers made strong gains in the Maine and Vermont state elections ahead of November and in Vermont actually replaced the Democrats as the main opposition to the Whigs. In the first presidential election to be held on the same day in every state, Van Buren received 291,000 popular votes, or slightly more than 10 percent. In three states (Massachusetts, New York, and Vermont), the Free Soil Party eclipsed the Democrats as the second-largest party. Most of the new converts were former Democrats attracted by the presence of Van Buren on the top of the ticket; Johnson estimates that even if the New York Barnburners are discounted, "Democrats contributed proportionally more support than the Whigs" to the new party. Twelve Free Soilers were elected to the House of Representatives, and a coalition of Free Soilers and Democrats in Ohio elected Chase to the Senate. Downballot the party performed respectably, electing several dozen state legislators across the Upper North. The Liberty ticket of Smith and Foote received fewer than 3,000 votes, almost all from New York. The Free Soil coalition thus spelled the death of the Liberty Party as an independent political force.

=== Decline, 1849–60 ===
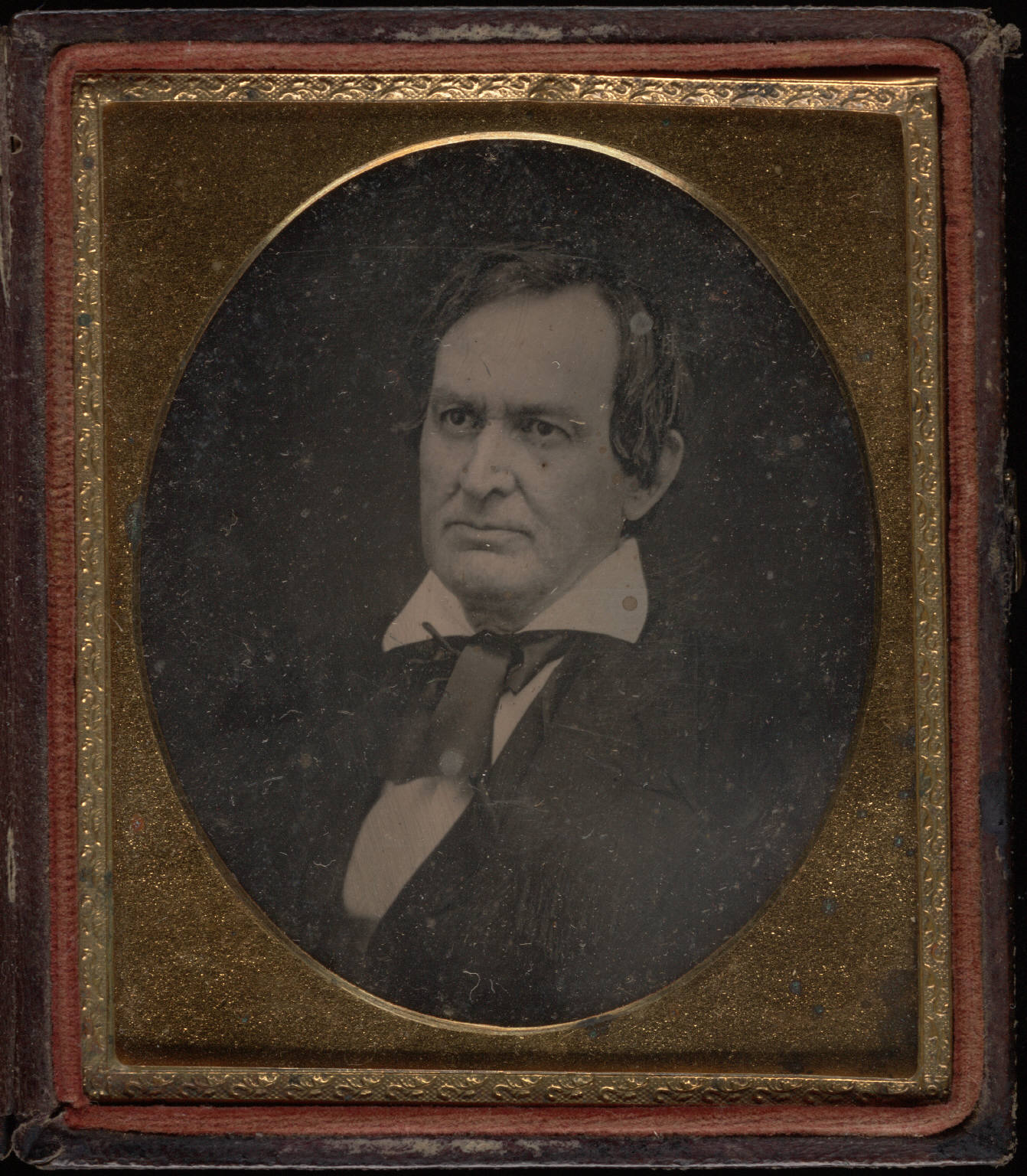
Gerrit Smith, around the time of his election to the House of Representatives.

The Buffalo Convention in effect marked the end of the Liberty Party as a significant force in electoral politics. After 1848, the party's grassroots infrastructure was absorbed into the Free Soil Party, and the loyalty of most Liberty leaders and voters transferred to the new organization. A remnant led by Smith and Goodell persisted until 1860 under various names. From his seat in the Senate, Chase emerged as one of the leaders of the Free Soil Party. In 1854, during the vitriolic debates over the repeal of the Missouri Compromise, he penned the Appeal of the Independent Democrats and helped to arrange the fusion of the Free Soilers with other opponents of the Kansas–Nebraska Act to form the Republican Party. He was a candidate for president at the 1860 Republican National Convention, but the nomination went to Abraham Lincoln.

Smith was a delegate to the 1852 Free Soil National Convention in Pittsburgh that nominated Hale for president and George Washington Julian for vice president. In an open letter "to the Liberty Party of the County of Madison," he declared that while the platform adopted by the Pittsburgh convention was lacking in certain respects, most notably in its failure to declare slavery unconstitutional, "I, nevertheless, regard myself as a member of that party. It is a good party—and it will, rapidly, grow better." He urged the Liberty Party not to disband, but to maintain a separate organization in hopes of reforming the Free Soil Party through outside pressure. When the Liberty Party met in convention at Canastota, New York, later that year, Smith opposed the motion to nominate a separate presidential ticket and advocated cooperation with the Free Soil Party. Smith's motion carried by a vote of 55–41, whereupon the convention adjourned until October 1; the minority remained behind and nominated Goodell for president. A committee was appointed to interview Hale to determine his views on the constitutionality of slavery. Hale, however, ignored these entreaties. When the Liberty National Convention reconvened on September 30, Smith switched his support to Goodell, and the latter was nominated on a ticket with S. M. Bell. Other Liberty men continued to support Hale. Frederick Douglass warned abolitionists not to desert the Free Soil Party and continued to display the names of Hale and Julian in the masthead of his publication, Frederick Douglass' Newspaper, through the campaign. In the fall election, Goodell received 72 votes in New York, and Smith was elected to Congress from New York's 22nd congressional district as an independent antislavery candidate. (Note: Dubin mistakenly assigns the 72 votes for the Liberty ticket in New York to Gerrit Smith.)

In 1855, as the Free Soil movement was in the process of being absorbed into the growing Republican Party, Smith and other Liberty Party veterans met at Syracuse, New York. Lamenting the inadequacy of free soilism and the failure of Garrisonian moral suasion, they declared, "the Liberty Party is the only political party in the land, that insists on the right and duty to wield the political power of the nation for the overthrow of every part and parcel of American Slavery." The convention narrowly decided against arming antislavery militants in Kansas and approved a declaration demanding the immediate abolition of slavery by the national government, affirming the antislavery character of the Constitution, and promising an "aggressive [...] contest with the slave power." A later gathering nominated Smith for president in 1856; Samuel McFarland was nominated for vice president. The pair received 321 popular votes, all from New York and Ohio. Following the election, the Liberty Party held its final convention at Syracuse on September 30, 1857, before merging with the new Radical Abolitionist Party.

Smith ran for governor of New York in 1858 with the support of Radical Abolitionists and other reformers on the People's state ticket. While observers predicted Smith could poll between 25,000 and 50,000 votes, his final result was less than 6,000. Smith made his final bid for the presidency in 1860; once again, McFarland was the party's vice presidential candidate. The ticket received 176 votes in three states: 35 from Illinois, five from Indiana, and 136 from Ohio. The election was won by Abraham Lincoln, who went on to serve as president during the American Civil War. In later years, Smith, Douglass, and other veterans of the Liberty League would join Lincoln's Republican Party, driving the party to ratify the Thirteenth Amendment and to support the rights of freed people during Reconstruction.

== Ideology and policies ==
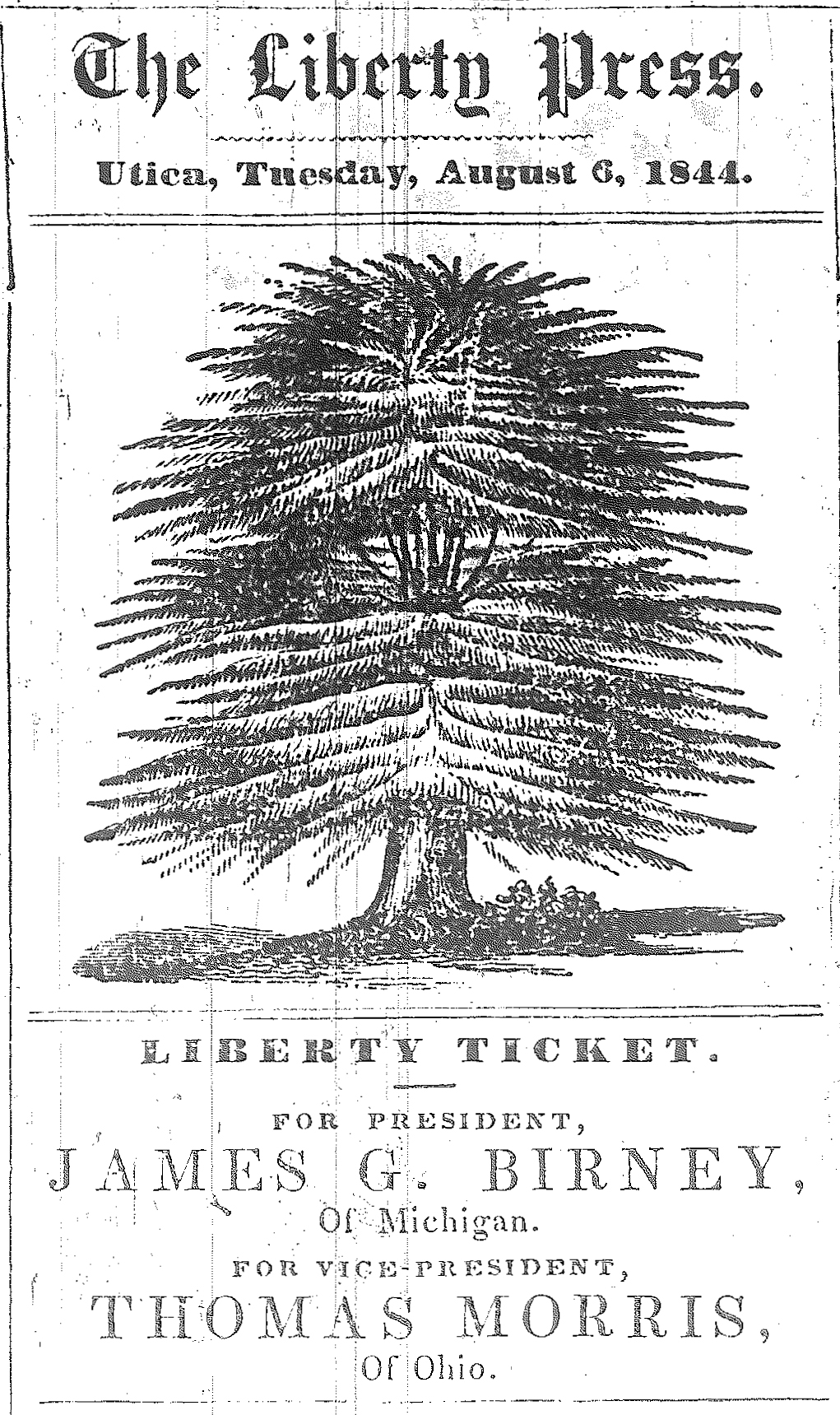
The cedar of Lebanon, a symbol of the Liberty Party.

In 1843, Gerrit Smith described the Liberty Party as he understood it to be, "a union of men of all shades of opinion on other subjects, embracing all who are willing to co-operate for the one object of abolishing slavery." By 1847, he had come to amend this view. Despite the electoral success of the New Hampshire coalitionists, Smith judged the prospects of converting the two major parties to antislavery principles were more hopeless than ever, and that the Liberty Party must therefore cease to be a "temporary" party and become a "permanent" party with a comprehensive political program extending beyond the immediate aims of the abolitionist movement. Whether and how the Liberty Party should address issues apart from slavery, and the nature of their relationship to antislavery members of the two established parties, were key points of contention in the internal struggle to define the ideology and character of the Liberty Party prior to 1848.

=== Political abolitionism ===
Unlike the later Free Soil and Republican parties, whose leaders disavowed any intent to interfere directly with slavery in the states, the Liberty Party was explicitly abolitionist in its outlook and leadership. The 1841 convention that formed the national party organization and selected the Liberty moniker announced the party's "paramount objects" as namely, "emancipation, abolition, [and] human freedom" for all people held in bondage. While moderate critics of slavery frequently sought to distinguish between opposition to the negative social, political, and economic conditions created by slavery and support for the human rights of enslaved people, the Liberty Party made no such distinction. The express aim of the Liberty Party's political program was to bring about the swift, unconditional, and universal emancipation of all enslaved people in the United States. While the Liberty leaders' embrace of direct political action eventually drew them into conflict with William Lloyd Garrison, they shared the immediatist perspective of the AASS and rejected the equivocal position maintained by the American Colonization Society.

Nonetheless, the electoralism of the Liberty leaders reflected significant pragmatic and philosophical differences with the Garrisonians respecting the fundamental nature of the United States Constitution and the problem of slavery itself that split the AASS in 1840. Garrison held that the Constitution was an irredeemably proslavery document and strongly opposed abolitionist entry into politics, remaining wholly committed to the strategy of moral suasion. Frederick Douglass initially rejected a political solution to slavery, arguing that emancipation was only practicable by directly challenging anti-Black prejudice. In contrast, the Liberty leaders increasingly came to see the Constitution as an antislavery document and slavery as a political as well as a moral problem. They noted the absence of any explicit mention of slavery in the Constitution, a fact they interpreted as highly significant in light of the Somerset case, which had found that slavery could not exist without positive legal sanction. After 1844, Liberty propagandists began arguing that slavery had been de jure abolished during the American Revolution and that its continued existence had no constitutional basis. Douglass came ultimately to accept this view by the time of his celebrated Fourth of July oration in 1852, when he described the Constitution as a "glorious liberty document" whose true reading had been subverted by corrupt proslavery officials.

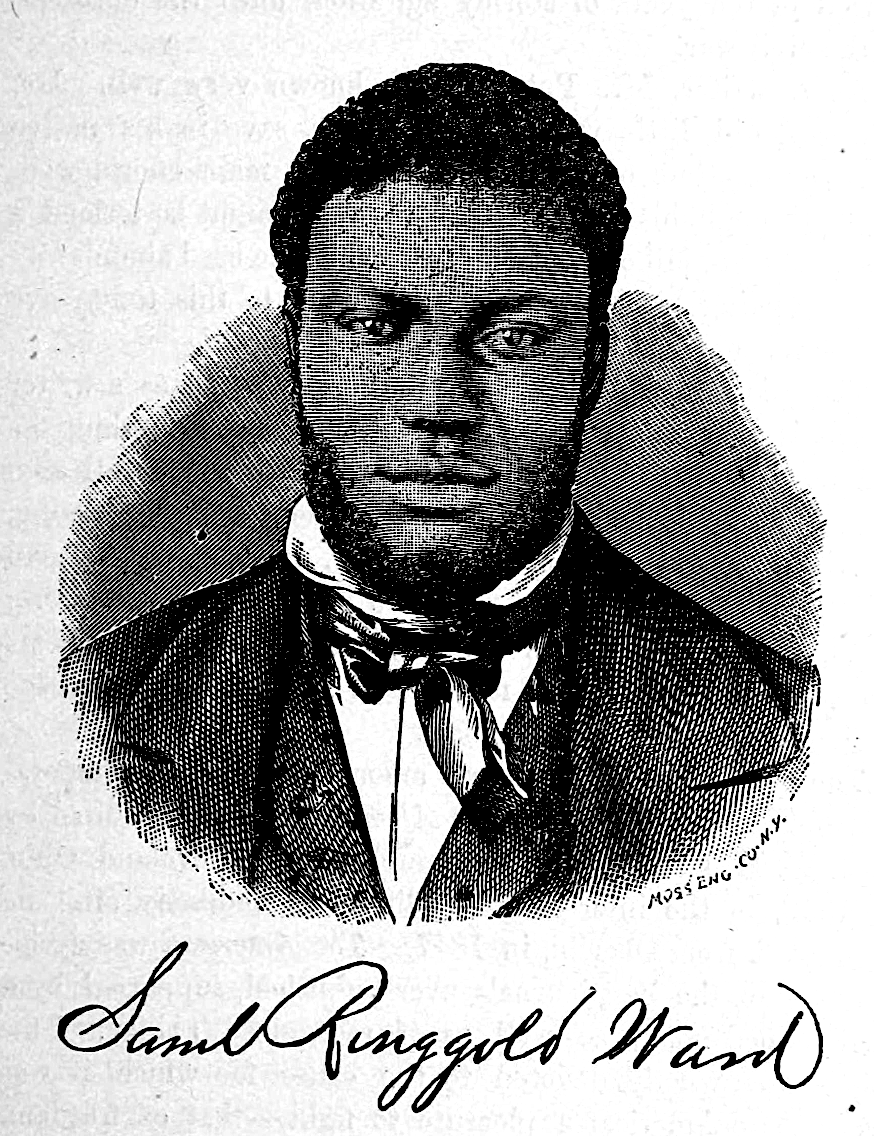
"Public opinion, it was thought, was not sufficient to abolish Slavery, without some legislative action." —Samuel Ringgold Ward

Additionally, the experience of the 1830s had persuaded the Liberty leaders that moral suasion alone could not abolish slavery, because "slaveholders did not care for moral suasion abolitionists." Having experienced political persecution at the hands of the United States government through instruments such as the gag rule, they became convinced of the necessity of direct political action to counteract the influence of the Slave Power. Liberty members also clashed with Garrisonians over the issue of nonresistance. Influenced by the involvement of Black abolitionists like Henry Highland Garnet, Liberty meetings sometimes adopted resolutions expressing support for slave rebellions such as the Creole case, a step which the Garrisonians were not willing to endorse. While some political abolitionists opposed the involvement of women in the abolitionist movement in leadership roles, including James G. Birney, feminists like Smith, Henry B. Stanton, and Joshua Leavitt who supported an equal role for women in antislavery societies also joined the Liberty Party.

Outside influences shaped the intellectual attitude of the Liberty Party, especially after 1844. The abolitionist movement existed within what Ronald G. Walters called a "reform tradition" in American history; many abolitionists, including Liberty leaders, were active in the early feminist, temperance, nonresistant, and utopian socialist movements. Waters sees the influence of the liberal concept of "possessive individualism" on the abolitionist movement, its language "an interesting mixture of Christianity and commerce" with roots in 17th century English political thought. In contrast to the nationalist Whig Party, but in line with the Jacksonian Democratic Party, Liberty leaders took a generally skeptical view of state power consistent with classical liberalism; the 1848 platform of the Liberty League urged that "what the people can do, it, and in no instance, the Government, should do," and added with respect to public charity that "there would, if not for the abuses and oppressions of Government, be comparatively few poor." The same document praised the policies of the French democratic socialists, including the National Workshops.

Liberty literature expressed a general egalitarian outlook with implications extending beyond the abolition of slavery. The platform adopted by the 1843 National Liberty Convention declared, "the Liberty party has not been organized merely for the overthrow of slavery ... but it will also carry out the principle of equal rights into all its practical consequences and applications, and support every just measure conducive to individual and social freedom." This egalitarianism formed the core principle of the Liberty Party and was sometimes called by contemporary participants the movement's unifying "one idea." As the party was tearing itself apart in 1848, the rump National Liberty Convention that nominated Smith and Foote expressed, "the Liberty Party is not a temporary but a permanent party—not a piece-of-an-idea party, but the whole-of-an-idea party—not bound to carry out the one idea of political justice against slavery only, but against wars, tariffs, the traffic in intoxicating drinks, land monopolies, and secret societies, and whatever else is opposed to that comprehensive, great and glorious One Idea."

Whether the Liberty Party should be considered a temporary or permanent party remained a contentious issue up to and after the national convention of the Free Soil Party in 1848, when the majority of Liberty members were subsumed into the larger organization. One group favored a single-minded focus on the abolition of slavery to the exclusion of all other goals and opening the party to all who shared this objective, regardless of their positions on temperance, land reform, or other causes. This included those like Chase who saw the role of the Liberty Party as fundamentally to reform the established parties through outside pressure, prompting an electoral realignment in which Liberty voters would join antislavery Whigs and Democrats in a new, broad-tent anti-extension party. Like the earlier Anti-Masonic Party, they imagined the Liberty Party would dissolve once its immediate aims were accomplished. Others, namely the Liberty League, understood the Liberty Party as a continuous reform movement animated by a comprehensive political theory embodied by the party's "one idea." In this view, cooperation with factions who shared certain immediate policy objectives with the Liberty Party but rejected its larger egalitarian ethic ultimately weakened the movement and destroyed the usefulness of the Liberty Party as a transformational agent in national politics. These conflicting interpretations of the role of political abolitionism reflected the range of attitudes towards politics and political parties in the Early Republic and the interaction of various reform causes in the 19th century United States.

==== Slave Power thesis ====
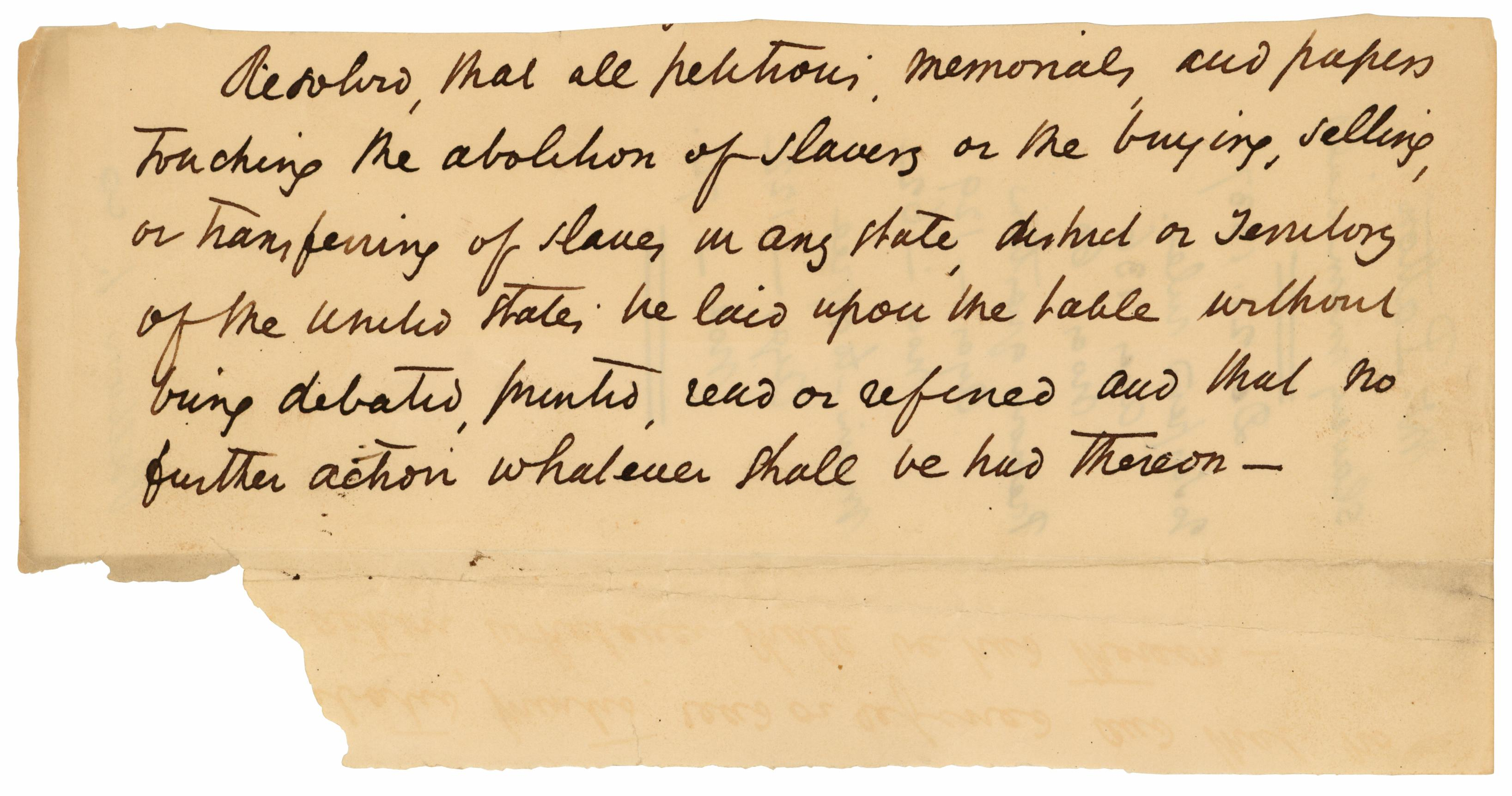
Text of the congressional gag rule, cited by Liberty members as evidence of the political influence of the Slave Power.

Core to the Liberty Party's perspective and political program was the belief, expressed in party literature and resolutions by Liberty meetings and conventions, that the United States government was controlled by a corrupt proslavery faction who used their political influence to protect slavery and the interests of slaveholders. Liberty members observed that slaveholders had controlled the presidency for all but 12 years between 1789 and 1849, while the national leaders of both established political parties were either slaveholders or held proslavery views. They alleged that major political events such as the Missouri Crisis, the Nullification Crisis, the annexation of Texas, and the Mexican–American War had been instigated by slaveholders to increase their political power, and that federal measures such as the gag rule and the Fugitive Slave Act of 1793 demonstrated the influence of the Slave Power and posed a threat to the civil liberties of white northerners as well as free people of color. The ability of the Slave Power thesis to explain the actions of governments and political parties in relation to slavery made it a potent weapon in the hands of political abolitionists, who argued persuasively that proslavery political corruption required organized antislavery political resistance. The cooption of the Whig and Democratic parties by the Slave Power meant that the Liberty Party was the only practical vehicle for political opposition to slavery.

Reinhard Johnson notes that from 1841, the Liberty Party "avoided much of the religious rhetoric and imagery" commonly associated with the abolitionist movement and instead emphasized its opposition to the political influence of the Slave Power. Chase in particular sought to moderate the party's public image and win support from a skeptical northern electorate by casting the anti-Slave Power stance as the party's signature issue. Chase assumed that the national government lacked the authority to abolish slavery in the states and that abolition would therefore necessarily be accomplished by the states themselves; the role of an antislavery party was to weaken slavery by denying it the support of the national government, while persuading the large majority of whites who were not large slaveholders of the benefits of abolition. He assessed that moral arguments appealed to only a narrow swath of the electorate, concentrated in areas of Yankee settlement, while the constitutional violations and economic malaise associated with the domination of the Slave Power posed more compelling reasons for white voters to abandon their former partisan allegiances. Simultaneously, Chase sincerely believed that the domination of the national government by the Slave Power threatened the foundations of republican institutions. By his estimation, large slaveholders accounted for roughly one percent of the population of the United States; that slaveholders were able to so effectively keep control of Congress, the White House, the Supreme Court, and leadership of both established political parties made a mockery of democratic self-government. In a letter to Joshua Leavitt, Chase and other Ohio Liberty leaders wrote that "the proper end of a Liberty Party [is] the deliverance of the government from the control of the slave power. ... If slavery should cease tomorrow, this great aim would still remain." The destruction of the Slave Power thus appeared as at once the most immediate and practical means of stopping the spread of slavery nationally, a politically useful argument for recruiting new voters to the antislavery cause, and a desirable object in its own right.

=== Platform ===
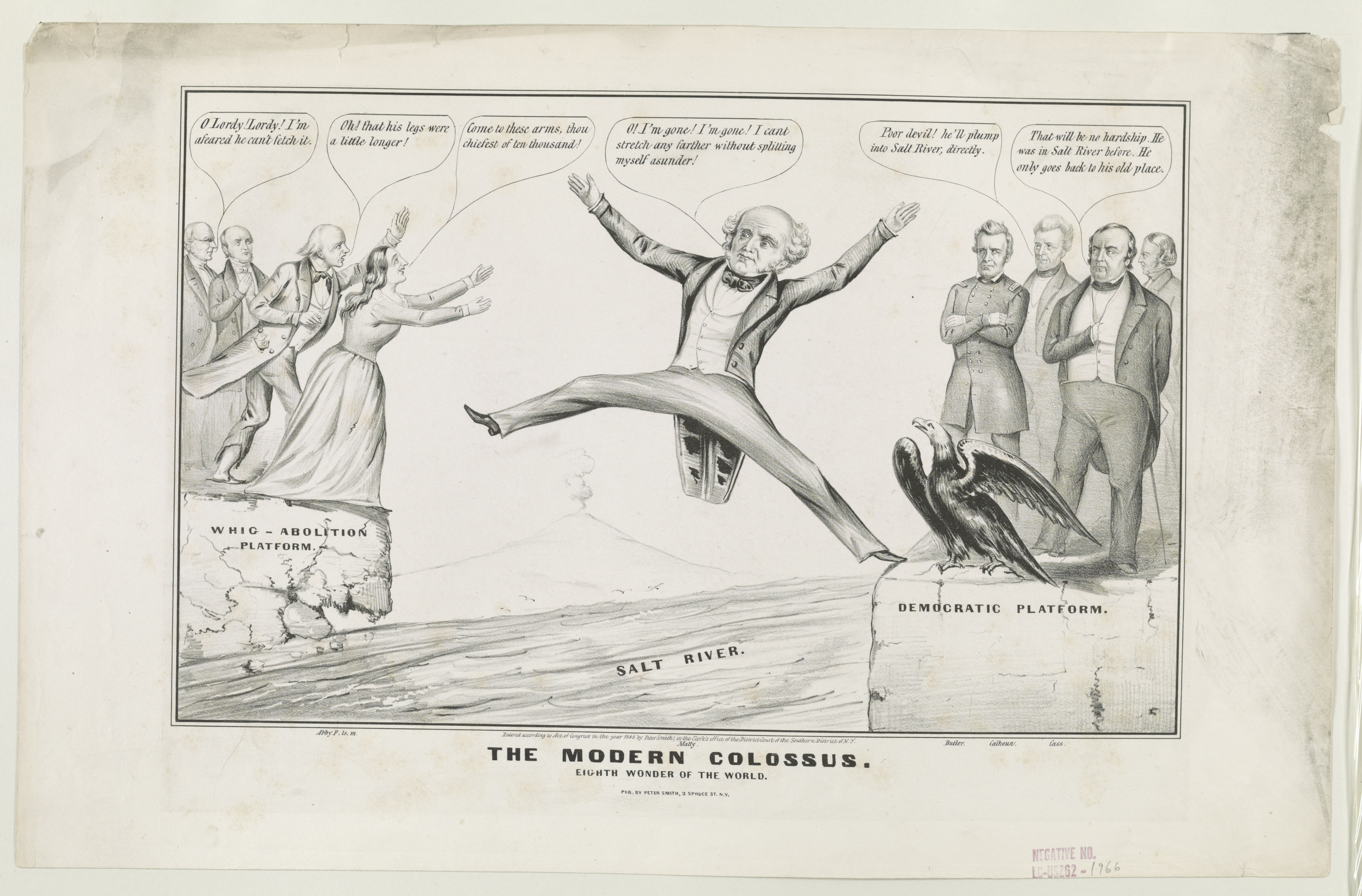
In this anti-abolitionist cartoon, Martin Van Buren struggles to span the gap dividing former Whig, Democratic, and Liberty members of the Free Soil Party.

Garrisonian and Anti-Garrisonian abolitionists shared the goal of immediate, unconditional, and universal emancipation for all enslaved people in the United States. While the AASS used moral suasion to work toward this goal, political abolitionists put forward a series of policy proposals designed to isolate and weaken slavery, protect the rights of free and freed people of color, and undermine support for slavery among non-slaveholders.

The platform adopted by the 1843 National Liberty Convention, prepared by Chase, pledged the party to "do all in their power for immediate emancipation." The platform did not call on the national government to abolish slavery in the states, in keeping with Chase's view that Congress lacked constitutional authority for such an action. Instead, it demanded "the absolute and unqualified divorce of the General Government from slavery:" the abolition of slavery in the territories and in the District of Columbia, and in national waters; the repeal of the Three-Fifths Clause and the Fugitive Slave Clause of the Constitution; the repeal of the 1793 Fugitive Slave Act; preference for free labor in dispensing federal patronage and contracts; and repeal of the congressional gag rule. The convention expressed support for the efforts of free people of color to achieve equal political and civil rights and declared that the United States military should not be used to suppress an enslaved rebellion. It declared the Fugitive Slave Clause to be null and void, on the reasoning that "any contract, covenant or agreement to do an act derogatory to natural rights is vitiated and annulled by its inherent immorality," and called on the free states to adopt legislation to protect the rights of people of color accused under the national fugitive slave law.

The platform adopted by the 1847 National Liberty Convention reaffirmed that "the paramount object of the Liberty party is the abolition of slavery in the United States by the constitutional acts of the Federal and State Governments." It repeated the demands of the 1843 platform with respect to slavery and the rights of free people of color; the planks relating to slave revolts and the novel legal theory around the Fugitive Slave Clause, however, were dropped. In closing, the delegates expressed their firm conviction that "the measures which we propose ... will result, at no distant day, in the establishment of peaceful emancipation throughout the Union."

==== Liberty League ====
Smith was among those dissatisfied by the narrowness of the 1847 platform. In his remarks to the convention, he chastised the delegates for limiting themselves to antislavery agitation and neglecting other pressing issues before the nation. A resolution declaring the Liberty Party a "permanent party" was defeated by a vote of 26 to 103. Smith observed ruefully that "many Liberty men repose a measure of confidence in the pro-slavery parties; and thereby hinder themselves from rightly deciding what should be the character and work of the Liberty party."

When the Liberty League refused to be absorbed into the Free Soil Party in the summer of 1848 and nominated Smith for president as the "genuine" Liberty Party candidate, they adopted a platform and address embracing a comprehensive interpretation of the "one idea" principle. Affirming "the most glaring instance, in which, in our own country, Government fails to afford protection to its own subjects, is slavery," the address positively asserted that the national government "has power, under its Constitution, to abolish every part of American slavery" and declared state laws recognizing slavery to be null and void. It endorsed universal suffrage, a progressive income tax, an end to private ownership of land, prohibition against extrajudicial oaths administered by secret societies, temperance, abolition of the army and navy, free trade, a ten-hour workday, and a homestead exemption. It opposed public interference in schools and seminaries and publicly funded internal improvements and supported trade unions as an alternative to state intervention in the economy. In addition to these causes, the platform condemned the conduct of the Polk Administration in the Mexican–American War and expressed support for the free produce movement.

== Bases of support ==
Like the larger antislavery movement from which it sprang, the Liberty Party's strength lay with Protestant evangelicals of Yankee extraction and free people of color. Lee Benson described the profile of the Liberty electorate in western New York as men from "small, moderately prosperous Yankee farming communities," typically individuals of "considerable standing" and "much better than average education," who "shared a common set of 'radical religious beliefs.'" However, Reinhard Johnson notes that Protestant evangelicals in the Liberty Party were "liturgically indistinguishable" from their brethren who did not become political abolitionists, while local leaders struggled to make ends meet and "often lived on the edge of poverty." The party attracted strong support from women and African-Americans, who were involved at the highest levels of the party as delegates, campaign surrogates, and officers in the national organization.

A study of voters in the Liberty Party stronghold of Smithfield, New York, found that Liberty members were substantially less likely to be farmers than non-abolitionists and similarly more likely to be professionals, skilled artisans, or laborers. Most had been born in New York, but a proportionally larger share came from New England compared to the overall population. While some leading citizens joined the Liberty Party, in aggregate Liberty voters were not wealthier or better educated than non-abolitionists. These findings contradict Benson's description of the Liberty electorate but are consistent with the self-portrait of the Liberty Party drawn by contemporary abolitionist writers, who considered themselves the representatives of the "honest, hard-handed, clear-headed free laborers and mechanics of the north."

The intense religiosity of Liberty members was reflected by the involvement of Protestant clergy in the party; Johnson states that at least one-third of Liberty editors and a substantial share of Liberty candidates were ministers. The party drew from evangelical as well as mainline Protestant churches, although Liberty members represented a minority of both groups. Alan M. Kraut speculates that evangelical abolitionists responded to the anti-institutionalism of the Second Great Awakening by joining the Liberty Party, a course that was consistent with a religious philosophy that called on Christians to "come out" of corrupt churches, governments, and political parties whose leaders were mired in sin.

Initially, former Whigs made up a large majority of Liberty voters; as the party gained greater support after 1842, it added large numbers of antislavery Democrats, who eventually came to predominate. Between two-thirds and three-quarters of men who cast Liberty ballots in Connecticut gubernatorial elections between 1841 and 1843 had at one time been Whigs. Alienated by the events of the Tyler presidency and the equivocating rhetoric of Whig slaveholders like Henry Clay, they turned to the Liberty Party to vindicate the emancipationist hopes they had once placed in William Henry Harrison. After 1843, the nomination and election of James K. Polk, the Mexican–American War, and the overt hostility of national party leaders to antislavery politics drove many Democrats into the waiting arms of the Liberty Party. Simultaneously, the Whigs regained some support with antislavery voters through the efforts of those like William H. Seward and Joshua Reed Giddings. Resultantly, as the Liberty vote increased in annual elections, it also grew increasingly Democratic. Former Democrats predominated the Liberty Party by the time of its subsumption into the Free Soil Party, and the new organization was sometimes called the Free Democratic Party.

=== African-Americans ===
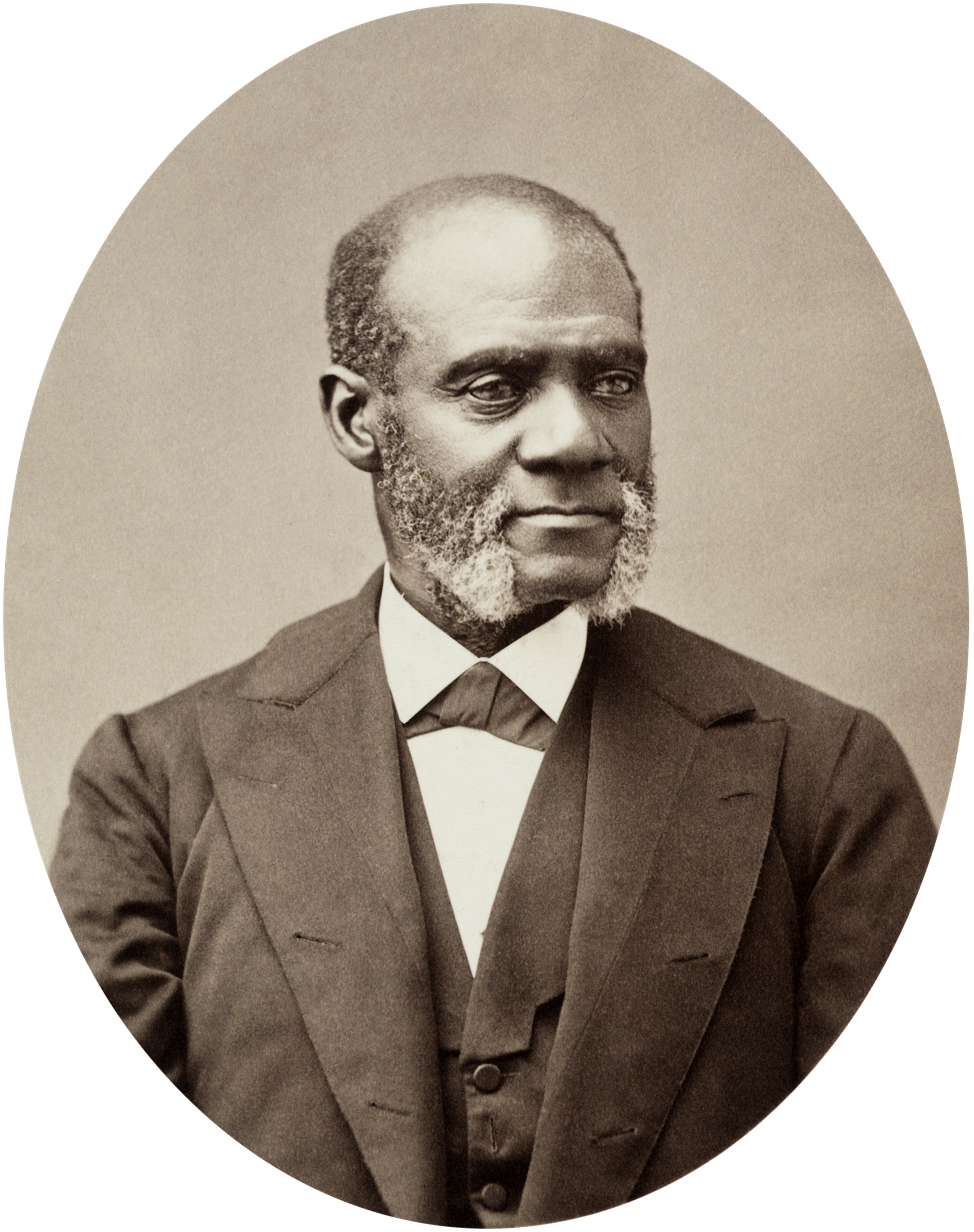
Henry Highland Garnet, abolitionist and Liberty Party speaker.

Although legally disenfranchised in most states, (Note: In 1776, Georgia, Virginia, and South Carolina alone restricted suffrage on the basis of race; between 1792 and 1838, every state outside Upper New England would repeal or severely restrict Black suffrage. At the time of the 1844 presidential election, Black men could vote on an equal basis with their white neighbors in only five states—Maine, Massachusetts, New Hampshire, Rhode Island, and Vermont. New York allowed some landowning Black men to vote.) free people of color were early, active, and vital supporters of the Liberty Party. Black men served as accredited delegates to the 1843 Liberty National Convention and John J. Zuille, Theodore S. Wright, and Charles Bennett Ray served on the nominating committee. Samuel Ringgold Ward and Henry Highland Garnet were among the nationally renowned Black abolitionists to address the convention. In Connecticut, the state Liberty Party was founded by James W. C. Pennington and Amos Beman, two locally prominent Black abolitionists. As Garrisonianism fell out of favor with Black abolitionists in the 1840s, Black support for the Liberty Party increased. Garnett, Ward, and Henry Bibb were among the party's foremost advocates and regularly clashed with Black Garrisonians who question the motives and strategy of political abolitionists. Frederick Douglass was one such early critic of the Liberty Party, but by 1848 had become involved in political abolitionism and was present at the Buffalo Convention that established the Free Soil Party. Martin Delany supported the Liberty Party via his newspaper, The Mystery, and participated in Liberty Party activities in Pittsburgh. In places where state law or local opinion was favorable to Black suffrage, men of color supported the Liberty Party with their ballots. Black men in Michigan voted the Liberty ticket in 1844 despite the whites-only suffrage clause in the state constitution, and Colored Conventions in New York and New England frequently adopted resolutions urging the Black community to vote for Liberty candidates.

Black involvement was critical to the success of the Liberty Party. Black abolitionists like Garnet, Ward, and Bibb were effective messengers for the party and their national reputations attracted much-needed publicity. The testimony of freed people was particularly effective in winning over skeptical white audiences. Their presence simultaneously legitimized the Liberty Party in the eyes of the abolitionist movement and pressured the party to take seriously the needs of the Black community. Black abolitionists were the driving force behind the movement in favor of Black suffrage and the repeal of the Black Codes; they argued Liberty members should be willing to cooperate with the established parties if they could secure meaningful commitments to support Black suffrage. Liberty meetings and conventions were racially integrated, and Black attendees were "treated equally and mingled freely" with white members. While Black members were rarely candidates for elected office, Ward received 12 votes for vice president at the 1848 convention of the Liberty League, finishing third out of a field of nine candidates.

=== Women ===
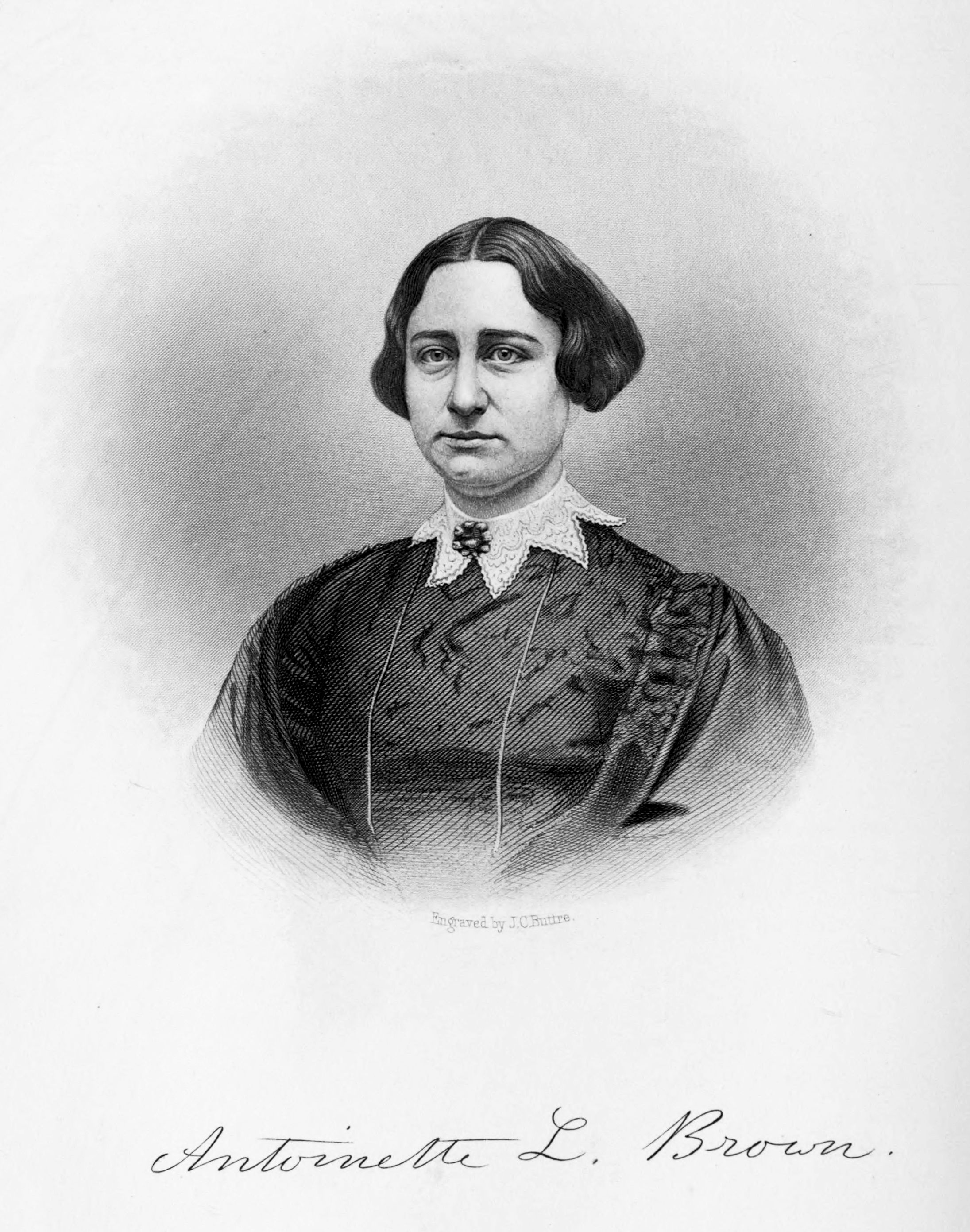
Antoinette Brown, abolitionist and feminist.

Women were indispensable participants in the Liberty Party; their involvement in Liberty campaigns and conventions mirrored their importance to the larger abolitionist movement. While the Cult of Domesticity consigned formal politics to the male sphere, women's role as guardians of morality in their homes and communities allowed them to enter Liberty meetings and speak on behalf of Liberty candidates in their public activism. Most Liberty members considered the party a moral crusade against slavery; an interest in Liberty activities thus appeared a natural extension of the female sphere. Women were frequently present for Liberty conventions and sometimes served as voting delegates. In the Old Northwest, with its tradition of women's political involvement, female abolitionists were prominent movers and drivers of the Liberty Party. The Henry County Female Anti-Slavery Society was the foremost Liberty mouthpiece in Indiana; the preamble and resolutions adopted by the society at its 1841 meeting expressly affirmed "that it is our duty to endeavor by all reasonable means to persuade our fathers, husbands and brothers to make use of their elective franchise to place men in office who will remove these evils [slavery and racial prejudice] by the introduction of righteous and just laws into the civil code of our country." Michigan Liberty women raised funds to support Liberty Party activities. The Illinois Female Anti-Slavery Society coordinated with the state Liberty Party, and female editorialists like Mary Brown Davis promoted the congressional candidacy of Owen Lovejoy. As the decade progressed, male abolitionists increasingly sought women's involvement in Liberty organizations and conventions. Abby Kelley attended the 1843 National Liberty Convention despite her Garrisonian leanings and made an impassioned address to the delegates, becoming the first woman to address the national convention of an American political party. Elizabeth Cady Stanton became involved in Liberty activism through her husband, Henry B. Stanton, and first cousin, Gerrit Smith. Antoinette Brown was a prominent female Anti-Garrisonian who took an active role in the New York Liberty Party and worked on Smith's 1852 congressional campaign. Lydia Child and Lucretia Mott each received one vote for president at the 1847 convention of the Liberty League, and Mott received five votes for vice president at the 1848 rump convention that nominated Smith and Foote.

== Electoral history ==
=== Presidential tickets ===
Election	Ticket		Election results			
Election	Presidential nominee	Running mate	Votes	Percent	Electoral votes	Result
1840	James G. Birney	Thomas Earle	6,946	0.29%	0 / 294	Lost
1844	James G. Birney	Thomas Morris	62,025	2.30%	0 / 275	Lost
1848	Gerrit Smith (Note: Replacing John P. Hale)	Charles C. Foote (Note: Replacing Leicester King)	2,751	0.10%	0 / 290	Lost
1852	William Goodell	S. M. Bell	72	0.00%	0 / 296	Lost

=== Gubernatorial races ===
From 1842, the Liberty Party was organized in every free state except New Jersey and fielded candidates for governor and other statewide offices. The following table displays the result for Liberty gubernatorial candidates in these states as a share of the total number of votes cast.

State	Gubernatorial election							
State	1840	1841	1842	1843	1844	1845	1846	1847
Connecticut	—N/a	—N/a	3.8%	3.4%	3.2%	3.7%	3.4%	3.6%
Illinois	n/a		1.1%	n/a			5.1%	n/a
Indiana	—N/a	n/a		1.4%	n/a		1.8%	n/a
Maine	—N/a	1.9%	5.7%	10.0%	7.0%	9.0%	13.0%	11.5%
Massachusetts	0.8%	3.1%	5.4%	7.3%	7.3%	7.9%	9.8%	8.7%
Michigan	n/a	3.2%	n/a	7.1%	n/a	7.7%	n/a	5.6%
New York	—N/a	n/a	1.8%	n/a	3.1%	n/a	3.2%	n/a
New Hampshire	—N/a	2.5%	5.7%	7.7%	11.7%	12.0%	18.8%	14.1%
Ohio	—N/a	n/a	2.1%	n/a	3.0%	n/a	4.4%	n/a
Pennsylvania	n/a	0.3%	n/a		0.8%	n/a		0.6%
Vermont	—N/a	6.3%	3.9%	7.5%	10.2%	13.5%	14.6%	14.4%

=== State lower chambers ===
The following table shows the share of seats in lower chambers of U.S. state legislatures held by Liberty members in states where the party held at least one seat from 1840 to 1848.

State	State lower chamber seats held by Liberty members								
State	1840	1841	1842	1843	1844	1845	1846	1847	1848
Connecticut	—N/a	—N/a	—N/a	—N/a	—N/a	1 (0.5%)	1 (0.8%)	—N/a	1 (0.8%)
Maine	—N/a	—N/a	—N/a	2 (1.3%)	—N/a	—N/a	6 (4.0%)	—N/a	—N/a
Massachusetts	—N/a	—N/a	3 (0.8%)	4 (1.2%)	2 (0.7%)	—N/a	3 (1.2%)	3 (1.1%)	—N/a
New Hampshire	—N/a	—N/a	—N/a	—N/a	—N/a	7 (3.0%)	11 (4.5%)	—N/a	—N/a
Vermont	—N/a	—N/a	—N/a	3 (1.4%)	8 (3.4%)	12 (5.1%)	10 (4.3%)	18 (7.6%)	—N/a

== Other prominent members ==
This is a representative sample of Liberty Party leaders not listed above as presidential or vice presidential candidates.

- William G. Allen
- John Albion Andrew
- Stephen Pearl Andrews
- James Appleton
- Gamaliel Bailey
- Wesley Bailey
- Guy Beckley
- Amos Beman
- Jehiel Beman
- Nathaniel S. Berry
- Henry Bibb
- Jacob Bigelow
- James M. Birney
- William Birney
- Jonathan Blanchard
- Sherman Booth
- Henry Ingersoll Bowditch
- George Bradburn
- Lawrence Brainerd
- William Henry Brisbane
- Antoinette Brown
- William Burleigh
- Elihu Burritt
- Alexander Campbell
- Philo Carpenter
- James G. Carter
- William L. Chaplin
- Salmon P. Chase
- Oren Burbank Cheney
- Joseph Cilley
- Lewis Clarke
- Ichabod Codding
- Levi Coffin
- Nathaniel Colver
- Alexander Crummell
- Mary Brown Davis
- William H. Day
- George DeBaptiste
- Martin Delany
- Elizur Deming
- Charles Wheeler Denison
- Charles Durkee
- Charles V. Dyer
- Russell Errett
- George Henry Evans
- James Fairchild
- Samuel Fessenden
- Asahel Finch Jr.
- Charles Grandison Finney
- George Washington Gale
- Elon Galusha
- Henry Highland Garnet
- Seth M. Gates
- Edward D. Gazzam
- Francis Gillette
- Beriah Green
- John Grimes
- Josiah B. Grinnell
- Cyrus Pitt Grosvenor
- Stephen S. Harding
- Samuel D. Hastings
- Joseph R. Hawley
- Joel Hayden
- Richard Hildreth
- Myron Holley
- Silas M. Holmes
- Edward D. Holton
- John Hooker
- Samuel Gridley Howe
- Erastus Hussey
- John Hutchins
- Titus Hutchinson
- James Caleb Jackson
- William Jackson
- William Jay
- John Jones
- John Keep
- Hiram Huntington Kellogg Sr.
- Chauncey L. Knapp
- William Lambert
- Lunsford Lane
- Charles Henry Langston
- John Mercer Langston
- William Larimer Jr.
- George Latimer
- Dewitt C. Leach
- Joshua Leavitt
- Francis Julius LeMoyne
- Samuel Lewis
- Jermain Wesley Loguen
- Joseph Cammett Lovejoy
- Owen Lovejoy
- William Pitt Lynde
- Asa Mahan
- Stanley Matthews
- Samuel Joseph May
- James Miller McKim
- Jonathan Miller
- Joseph Trotter Mills
- James Monroe
- John Monteith
- David Nelson
- James W. C. Pennington
- Abraham L. Pennock
- John Pierpont
- Allan Pinkerton
- Ralph Plumb
- David Potts Jr.
- John Rankin
- Charles Bennett Ray
- Alvah Sabin
- Orange Scott
- Samuel Edmund Sewall
- Oscar L. Shafter
- John Jay Shipherd
- James McCune Smith
- William Smyth
- Benjamin Stanton
- Henry B. Stanton
- Stephen Stevens
- Alvan Stewart
- George Storrs
- Jane Swisshelm
- Arthur Tappan
- Lewis Tappan
- Charles Turner Torrey
- Norton Strange Townshend
- Amos Tuck
- George Boyer Vashon
- Edward Wade
- Amasa Walker
- Samuel Ringgold Ward
- Laban Wheaton
- William Whipper
- John Greenleaf Whittier
- Austin Willey
- Austin F. Williams
- Charles K. Williams
- Samuel Newitt Wood
- Lewis Woodson
- Elizur Wright
- Theodore S. Wright
- Levi Yale
- John J. Zuille

== Works cited ==
- Benson, Lee (1961). The Concept of Jacksonian Democracy: New York as a Test Case. Princeton: Princeton University Press.
- Clauser-Roemer, Kendra (2009). "Tho' We are Deprived of the Privilege of Suffrage": The Henry County Female Anti-Slavery Society Records, 1841-1849 (Master of Arts thesis). Indiana University. doi:10.7912/C2/137.
- Dubin, Michael J. (2002). United States Presidential Elections, 1788-1860. Jefferson, NC: McFarland & Co. ISBN 978-0-7864-6422-7.
- Dubin, Michael J. (2007). Party Affiliations in State Legislatures: A Year by Year Summary, 1796–2006. Jefferson, NC: McFarland and Company.
- Earle, Jonathan H. (2004). Jacksonian Antislavery and the Politics of Free Soil, 1824-1854. Chapel Hill: University of North Carolina Press. ISBN 0-8078-5555-3.
- Gac, Scott (2007). Singing for Freedom: The Hutchinson Family Players and the Nineteenth-Century Culture of Reform. New Haven: Yale University Press.
- Frederick, J. M. H. (1896). National Party Platforms of the United States. Akron, Ohio.
- Foner, Eric (1991). Free Soil, Free Labor, Free Men: The Ideology of the Republican Party Before the Civil War. New York: Oxford University Press. ISBN 978-0-19-509497-8.
- Foner, Philip S. (1950). The Life and Writings of Frederick Douglass, Volume 2: Pre-Civil War Decade, 1850–1860. New York: International Publishers. ISBN 9780717804351.
- Holt, Michael F. (1999). The Rise and Fall of the American Whig Party: Jacksonian Politics and the Onset of the Civil War. New York: Oxford University Press. ISBN 0-19-516104-1.
- Howe, David Walker (2007). What Hath God Wrought: The Transformation of America, 1815-1848. New York: Oxford University Press. ISBN 978-0-19-507894-7.
- Johnson, Reinhard O. (2009). The Liberty Party 1840-48: Antislavery Third Party Politics in the United States. Baton Rouge: Louisiana State University Press. ISBN 9780807133934.
- Karcher, Carolyn (1994). The First Woman in the Republic: A Cultural Biography of Lydia Maria Child. Durham, NC: Duke University Press. ISBN 978-0-8223-2163-7.
- Kraut, Alan M. (1979). "The Forgotten Reformers: A Profile of Third Party Abolitionists in Antebellum New York". In Perry, Lewis; Fellman, Michael (eds.). Antislavery Reconsidered: New Perspectives on the Abolitionists. Baton Rouge: Louisiana State University. pp. 119–148. ISBN 978-0-8071-0479-8.
- Lause, Mark A. (2018). Long Road to Harpers Ferry. London: Pluto Press.
- Proceedings of the National Liberty Convention. Utica, NY: S.W. Green. 1848.
- Ratcliffe, Donald J. (Summer 2013). "The Right to Vote and the Rise of Democracy, 1787–1828". Journal of the Early Republic. 33 (2): 219–254. doi:10.1353/jer.2013.0033. JSTOR 24768843. S2CID 145135025.
- Rasmussen, Soren (Fall 2015). "Conviction and Circumstance: The Liberty Party in Indiana" (PDF). Earlham Historical Journal. 8 (1).
- Robertson, Stacey M. (2010). Hearts Beating for Liberty: Women Abolitionists in the Old Northwest. Chapel Hill: University of North Carolina Press. ISBN 9780807834084.
- Jordan, Ryan (Spring 2000). "The Indiana Separation and the Limits of Quaker Antislavery". Quaker History. 89 (1). JSTOR 41947430.
- Smith, Gerrit (1847). Speech of Gerrit Smith, Made in the National Convention of the Liberty Party, at Buffalo, October 21, 1847, on the Character and Scope of the Duties of the Liberty Party. Albany.
- Smith, Theodore Clarke (1897). The Liberty and Free Soil Parties in the Northwest. New York.
- Walters, Ronald G. (1979). "The Boundaries of Abolitionism". In Perry, Lewis; Fellman, Michael (eds.). Antislavery Reconsidered: New Perspectives on the Abolitionists. Baton Rouge: Louisiana State University. pp. 3–23. ISBN 978-0-8071-0479-8.
