= Free Presbyterian Church Synod of the United States =

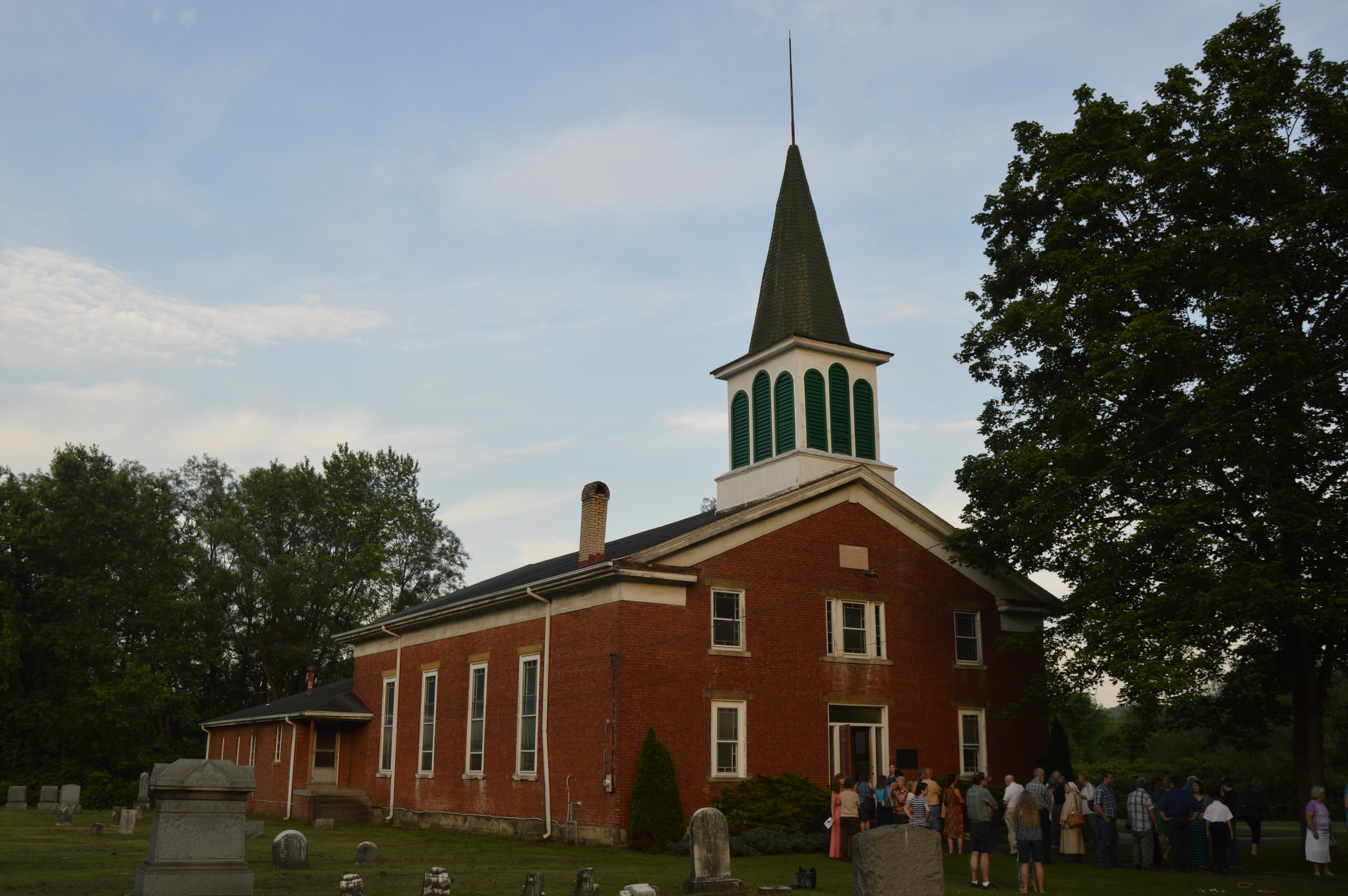
Former Free Presbyterian church at Darlington, Pennsylvania

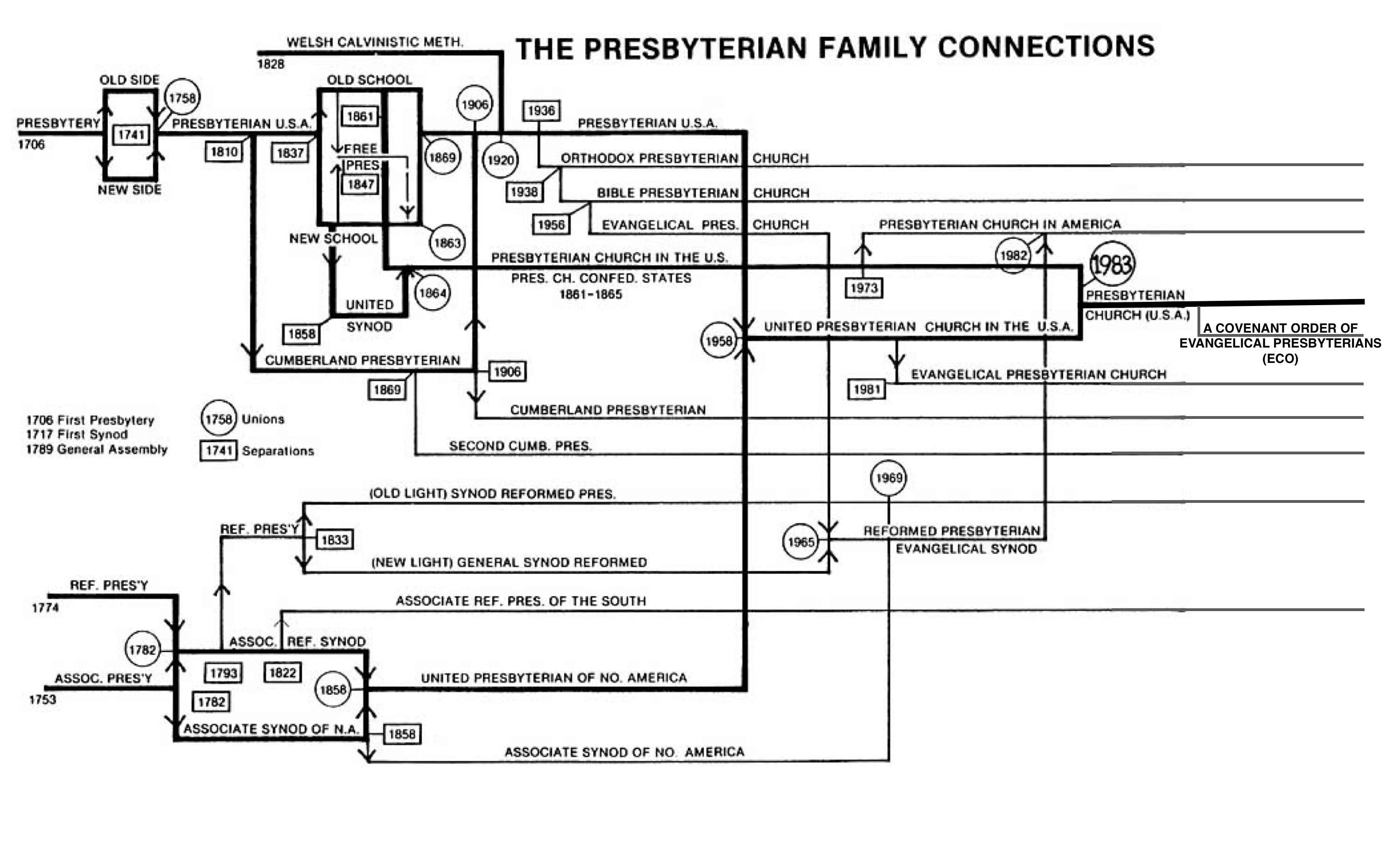
The P.C.U.S.A split in 1837 to become New School Presbyterians and Old School Presbyterians. Congregations from both of these factions joined the Free Presbyterian church when it was founded in 1847.

Free Presbyterian Church Synod of the United States was an anti-slavery denomination formed of churches that had withdrawn from Old School and New School Presbyterian Churches and that first organized as the Free Synod of Cincinnati in 1847.

The instigator was the Rev. John Rankin, a fervent abolitionist and pastor of a New School Presbyterian Church in Ripley, Ohio, who had unsuccessfully petitioned the General Assembly of his denomination to exclude slaveholders from membership. The Free Presbyterian Church remained small with seven presbyteries, about 72 congregations, and 70 ministers and licentiates, scattered from Pennsylvania to Iowa—though most congregations were in southern Ohio and western Pennsylvania. The church launched a newspaper, the Free Presbyterian in 1850 and Iberia College in 1854. At its peak in the early 1850s, the church had perhaps a thousand to two thousand communicants.

The church never developed a strong organization and in theology remained close to Presbyterian orthodoxy. Rankin had no desire to create his own ecclesiastical empire, and no other strong leaders appeared to solidify the organization. Although the Free Church may have challenged the conscience of the older Presbyterian bodies, it dwindled with the coming of the American Civil War. The synod itself did not meet after 1863, and most of the presbyteries failed to meet after 1865, though some Free Churches may have briefly survived the war.
