= William Goodell (abolitionist) =

American abolitionist (1792–1878)

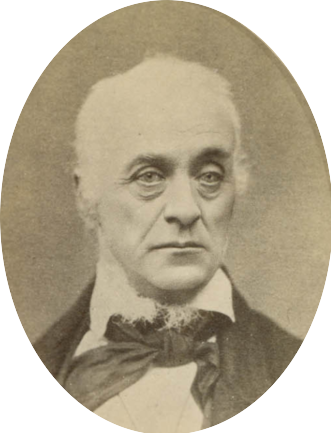
- Born: October 25, 1792; Coventry, New York, U.S.
- Died: February 14, 1878 (aged 85); Janesville, Wisconsin, U.S.
- Spouse: Clarissa C. Cady
- Children: 2

William Goodell (October 25, 1792 – February 14, 1878) was an American abolitionist and reformer born in Coventry, New York.

== Early life; temperance ==
Goodell spent several years of his early childhood confined to his room due to illness. It was during this confinement that he first discovered an appreciation for religion and writing. Following the deaths of his parents, William moved to Pomfret, Connecticut, to live with his paternal grandmother. He attended school but could not afford to go on to college. As a young adult, Goodell spent several years in various jobs in several different areas of the country, yet none of the work incorporated both of his interests in writing and religion. While working in Providence, Rhode Island, in 1823, William met and married Clarissa C. Cady. The couple later had two children.

In 1827, at age 35, Goodell became a journalist for a reform journal in Providence, allowing him to write from a religious perspective. His articles focused mostly on temperance. After moving the journal's headquarters to New York, Goodell became the leader of the American Temperance Society.

== Abolitionist ==
In 1833, Goodell helped found the New-York Anti-Slavery Society, as well as the American Anti-Slavery Society (AASS). He worked as an editor of The Emancipator and served on the AASS Executive Committee. In 1835, Goodell quit his job at The Emancipator and directed his energy to the New York State Anti-Slavery Society, editing its paper The Friend of Man in Utica, New York. While in Utica, Goodell focused on achieving abolition through political means. He helped form the Liberty Party in 1840, writing the convention address and party platform.

Two year later, Goodell left The Friend of Man and formed his own paper in order to promote church reform that followed abolitionist principles. Goodell believed that it was wrong for a church to hold even a neutral stance on slavery. He hoped to unite all of the churches denouncing slavery into a "Christian Union" and for nine years Goodell worked as a pastor of the anti-slavery churches in Honeoye, New York.

In 1852, Goodell was chosen as the Liberty Party's nominee for President of the United States, with S.M. Bell of Virginia as his running mate. His party fought for the complete abolition of slavery as well as equal rights for African Americans. Although Goodell promoted the same principles, he was also wary of the realities of prejudice. If abolition were to instigate true societal changes, he believed, prejudices would have to be eliminated and equal rights gained for African Americans. Goodell was also a potential candidate for the Liberty Party in 1848, but did not receive the nomination.

Goodell edited yet another paper called the American Jubilee (later renamed the Radical Abolitionist) during the 1850s. He also wrote an influential book entitled Slavery and Anti-Slavery: A History of the Great Struggle In Both Hemispheres; With a View of the Slavery Question in the United States, published in 1852. The next year he published The American Slave Code in Theory and Practice. That book previewed discussions of "law in books" and "law in action" made by the legal realists. It also directly countered proslavery writing that increasingly justified slavery on economic grounds. Goodell countered such arguments in two ways. First, he argued that such utilitarian arguments ignored the human costs of slavery; second, he argued that slavery led to great costs and thus was not economically justified.

== After the Civil War ==
When the Civil War ended, Goodell returned to fighting for his original cause of temperance and assisted in the creation of the Prohibition Party. He moved to Goshen, Connecticut, and later to Janesville, Wisconsin, where he died.

Goodell's daughter Lavinia Goodell (1839–1880) became the first woman admitted to practice law in Wisconsin, and his grandson, William Goodell Frost, served as president of Berea College.
