= Thomas Morris (Ohio politician) =

American judge

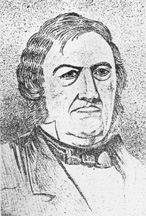

United States Senator from Ohio
- In office March 4, 1833 – March 3, 1839
- Preceded by: Benjamin Ruggles
- Succeeded by: Benjamin Tappan

Personal details
- Born: January 3, 1776 Berks County, Pennsylvania
- Died: December 7, 1844 (aged 68) Bethel, Ohio, U.S.
- Party: Democratic-Republican (Before 1825); Jacksonian (1825–1838); Democratic (1838–1840); Liberty (1840-1844)

Thomas Morris (January 3, 1776 – December 7, 1844) was an American politician from Ohio who served in the United States Senate and was a member of the Democratic Party. In the 1844 presidential election, he was the vice presidential nominee of the anti-slavery Liberty Party.

== Biography ==
Morris was born in Berks County, Pennsylvania, and enlisted as a Ranger to fight the Indians in 1793. He settled in western Ohio two years later. Morris began practicing law in Bethel, Ohio in 1804.

== Career ==
On May 12, 1806, shortly after the beginning of the 1806–1807 term of the Ohio House of Representatives, Morris contested the election of David C. Bryan and was awarded the seat from Clermont County.

Morris served in the Ohio State House of Representatives for Clermont County in 1806–1807, 1808–1809, 1810–1811, and 1820–1821. He served as Justice of the Ohio State Supreme Court in 1809. He was then a member of the Ohio State Senate for Clermont County in 1813–1815, 1821–1823, 1825–1829 and 1831–1833.

He was elected as Jacksonian Democrat to the U.S. Senate in 1833, and served a single term. In 1839 he was defeated for reelection because of support of abolition. After his defeat, Morris became increasingly vocal in his criticism of Ohio Democrats who opposed abolition and civil rights for free blacks. Finally in January 1840, delegates to the Ohio Democrat State Convention described Morris as "a rotten branch that should be lopped off" and expelled him from the party. Morris then became one of the early leaders of the Liberty Party in Ohio. He was nominated to the Vice Presidency by the Liberty Party in 1844 under James G. Birney. The ticket came in third after Democratic candidate James Knox Polk and Whig Party candidate Henry Clay.

== Family life ==
Morris was the father of Isaac Newton Morris and Jonathan David Morris.

== Death ==
He died December 7, 1844.

== Legacy ==
Morris was instrumental in developing and articulating the theoretical basis for the antislavery constitution. Author and prominent American Civil War historian Eric Foner argues in his seminal book Free Soil, Free Labor, Free Men that Sen. Morris is one of the most significant figures in the anti-slavery movement and the "first political martyr of the anti-slavery cause when he was denied re-election to the Senate because of his abolitionist convictions." He also argues that Morris "awakened (Salmon Chase) to the character of the Slave Power and to the need for political organization to combat its influences," leading the way for the term Slave Power to enter the American political jargon and paving the way for the creation of the Republican Party.

Ohio House of Representatives
Preceded by David Bryan	Member of the Ohio House of Representatives from Clermont County; 1806–1807	Succeeded by John Pollock
Preceded by John Pollock	Member of the Ohio House of Representatives from Clermont County; 1808–1809; Served alongside: William Fee	Succeeded by Amos Ellis; John Pollock
Preceded by Amos Ellis; John Pollock	Member of the Ohio House of Representatives from Clermont County; 1810–1811; Served alongside: John Pollock	Succeeded by John Pollock
Preceded by Alexander Campbell; David Morris	Member of the Ohio House of Representatives from Clermont County; 1820–1821	Succeeded by Gideon Minor
Ohio Senate
Preceded by Levi Rodgers	Member of the Ohio Senate from Clermont County; 1813–1815	Succeeded by John Bogges
Preceded by John Pollock	Member of the Ohio Senate from Clermont County; 1821–1823	Succeeded by Owen T. Fishback
Preceded by Owen T. Fishback	Member of the Ohio Senate from Clermont County; 1825–1829	Succeeded by William Wayland
Preceded by William Wayland	Member of the Ohio Senate from Clermont County; 1831–1833	Succeeded by William Doan
U.S. Senate
Preceded by Benjamin Ruggles	U.S. Senator (Class 1) from Ohio; 1833–1839; Served alongside: Thomas Ewing, William Allen	Succeeded by Benjamin Tappan
Party political offices
Preceded by Thomas Earle	Liberty nominee for Vice President of the United States; 1844	Succeeded by Leicester King; Withdrew
