= 1845–46 Massachusetts gubernatorial election =

- November 10, 1845
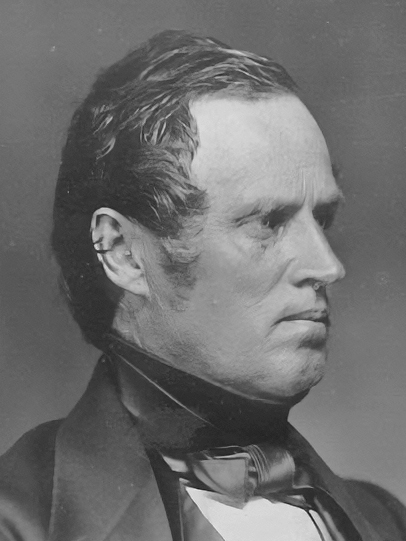

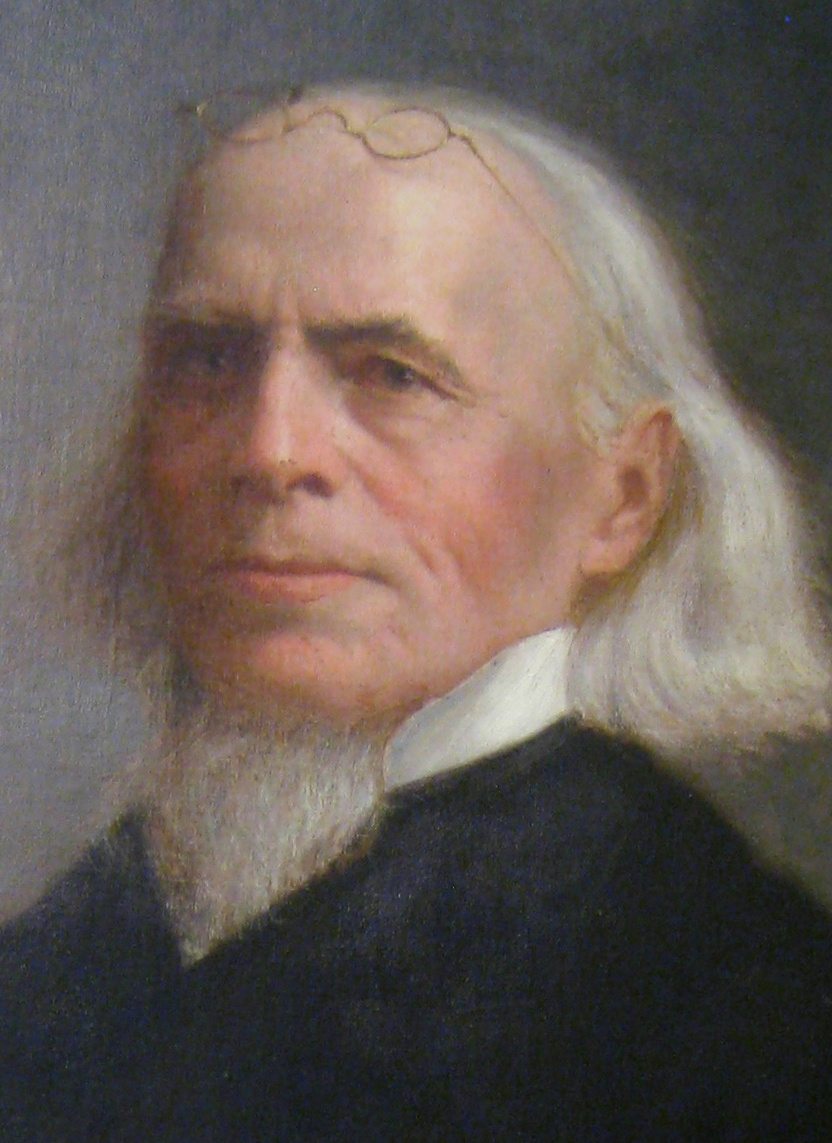

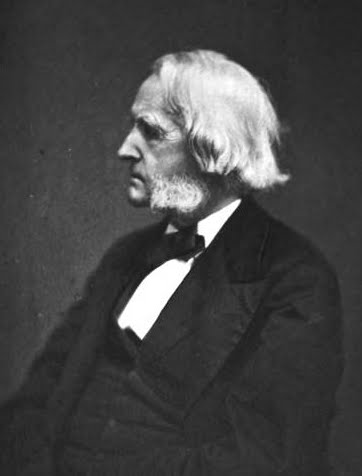

Nominee	George N. Briggs	Isaac Davis
Party	Whig	Democratic
Electoral vote	unanimous	0
Popular vote	51,638	37,427
Percentage	48.75%	35.33%
Nominee	Samuel E. Sewall	Henry Shaw
Party	Liberty	Know Nothing
Electoral vote	—	—
Popular vote	8,316	8,089
Percentage	7.85%	7.64%
- Popular election results by county Briggs: 40–50% 50–60% 60–70%
Governor before election
George N. Briggs
Whig
Elected Governor
George N. Briggs
Whig

The 1845–46 Massachusetts gubernatorial election consisted of an initial popular election held on November 10, 1845 that was followed by a legislative vote held on January 12, 1846. The ultimate task of electing the governor had been placed before the Massachusetts General Court because no candidate received the majority of the vote required for a candidate to be elected through the popular election. Incumbent Whig Governor George N. Briggs defeated Democratic nominee Isaac Davis, Liberty Party nominee Samuel E. Sewall and Know Nothing nominee Henry Shaw.

== General election ==
=== Candidates ===
- George N. Briggs, incumbent governor (Whig)
- Isaac Davis, member of the Massachusetts Senate from Worcester (Democratic)
- Frederick Robinson, former president of the Massachusetts Senate (Independent Democratic)
- Samuel E. Sewall, lawyer and candidate for governor in 1842, 1843, and 1844 (Liberty)
- Henry Shaw, former U.S. representative from Lanesboro (Native American)

=== Results ===
1845 Massachusetts gubernatorial election
Party	Candidate	Votes	%	±%
Whig	George N. Briggs	51,638	48.75%	▼3.08
Democratic	Isaac Davis	37,427	35.33%	▼5.43
Liberty	Samuel E. Sewall	8,316	7.85%	▲0.67
Know Nothing	Henry Shaw	8,089	7.64%	N/A
Independent Democrat	Frederick Robinson	368	0.35%	N/A
Write-in		86	0.08%	
Majority		14,211	13.42%	
Turnout		105,924		

=== Legislative election ===
As no candidate received a majority of the vote, the Massachusetts General Court was required to decide the election. Under Article III of the Constitution of Massachusetts, the House of Representatives chose two candidates from the top four vote-getters, the Senate electing the governor from the House's choice.

The House sent the names of Briggs and Davis to the Senate on January 10.

The legislative election was held on January 12, 1846.

Legislative election
Party	Candidate	Votes	%
Whig	George N. Briggs	unanimous	
Whig hold			
