= 1847 Massachusetts gubernatorial election =

- November 8, 1847
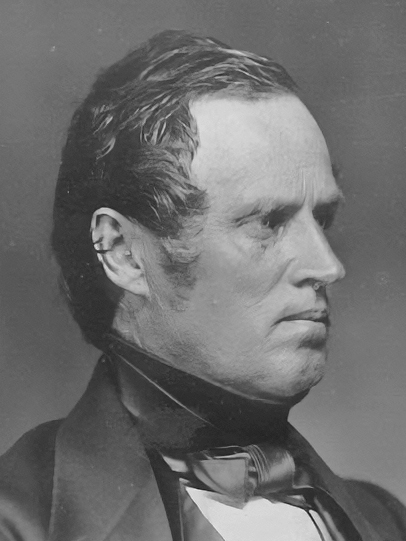

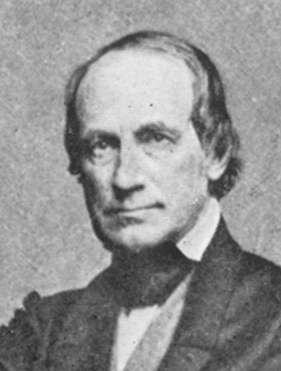

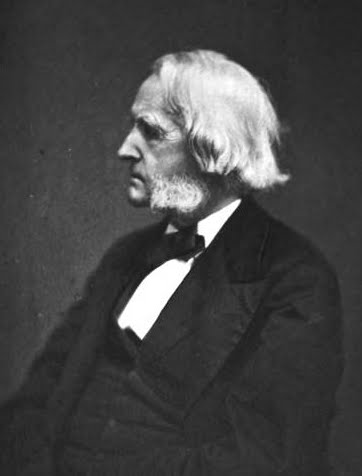
Nominee	George N. Briggs	Caleb Cushing	Samuel E. Sewall
Party	Whig	Democratic	Liberty
Popular vote	53,742	39,398	9,193
Percentage	50.97%	37.36%	8.72%
- County results Briggs: 40–50% 50–60% 60–70%
Governor before election
George N. Briggs
Whig
Elected Governor
George N. Briggs
Whig

The 1847 Massachusetts gubernatorial election was held on November, 8.

Incumbent Whig Governor George N. Briggs was re-elected to a fifth term in office over Democrat Caleb Cushing. This was the last election in which the Whig Party received a majority of the vote; after the emergence of the Free Soil Party in 1848, Whigs only won pluralities before fading away entirely by the 1857 election.

== Democratic nomination ==
=== Candidates ===
- Henry W. Bishop
- Caleb Cushing, former U.S. minister to China and U.S. representative from Newburyport
- Isaac Davis, state senator from Worcester and nominee for governor in 1845 and 1846
- David Henshaw, former U.S. secretary of the Navy

=== Convention ===
1847 Massachusetts Democratic Convention
Ballot	1	2
Cushing	153	264
Davis	117	87
Henshaw	65	0
Bishop	14	0
Others	19	10
Total	368	361

== General election ==
=== Candidates ===
- Francis Baylies, former U.S. chargé d'affaires in Buenos Aires and U.S. representative from Taunton
- George N. Briggs, incumbent governor since 1844 (Whig)
- Caleb Cushing, former U.S. minister to China and U.S. representative from Newburyport (Democratic)
- Samuel Edmund Sewall, Liberty nominee for governor since 1842 (Liberty)

=== Results ===
1847 Massachusetts gubernatorial election
Party	Candidate	Votes	%	±%
Whig	George N. Briggs (incumbent)	53,742	50.97%	▼2.81
Democratic	Caleb Cushing	39,398	37.36%	▲4.78
Liberty	Samuel Edmund Sewall	9,193	8.72%	▼1.09
Know Nothing	Francis Baylies	2,876	2.73%	▼0.63
Write-in		234	0.22%	▼0.26
Total votes		105,443	100.00%	

== See also ==
- 1847 Massachusetts legislature
