= 1846 Massachusetts gubernatorial election =

- November 9, 1846
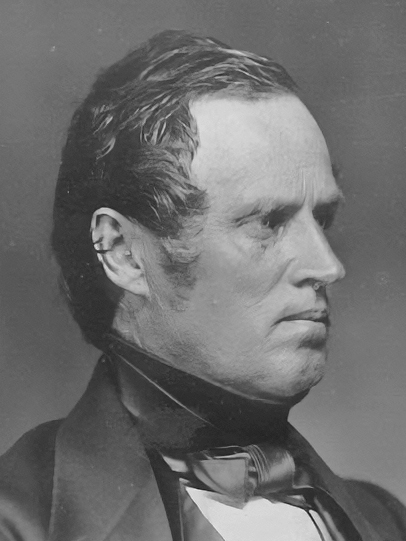

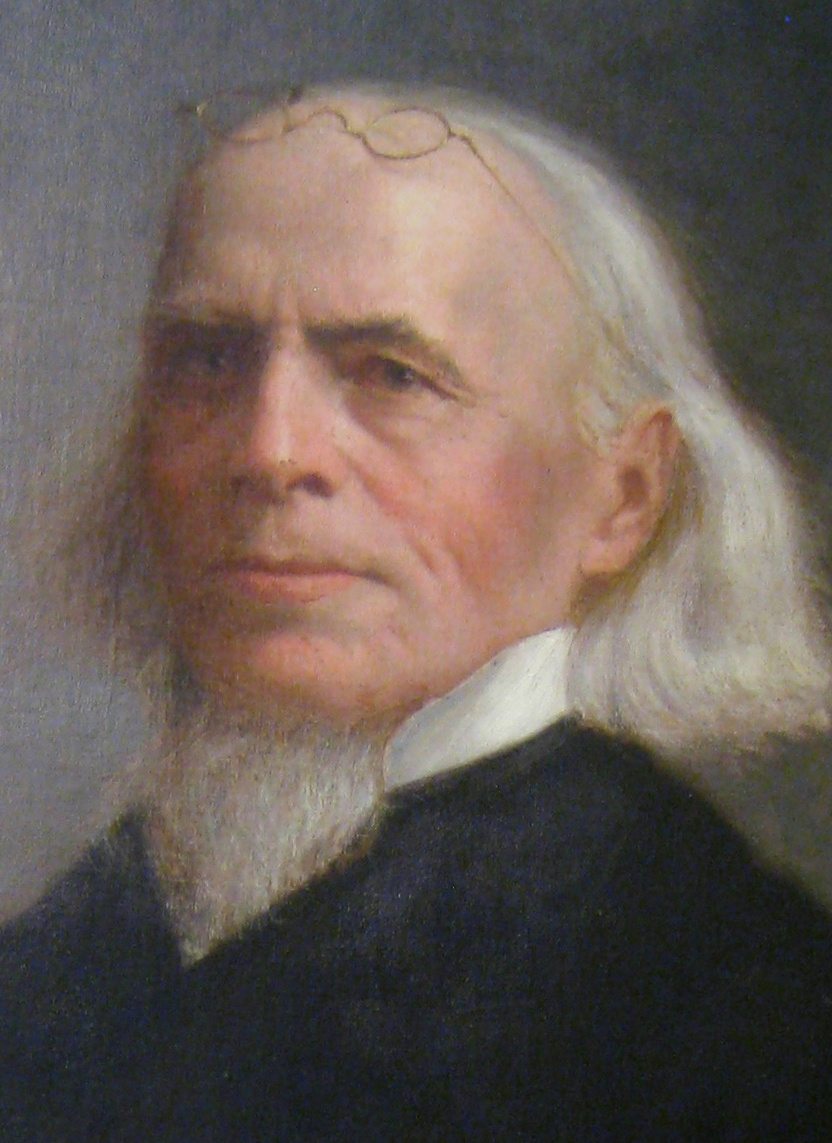

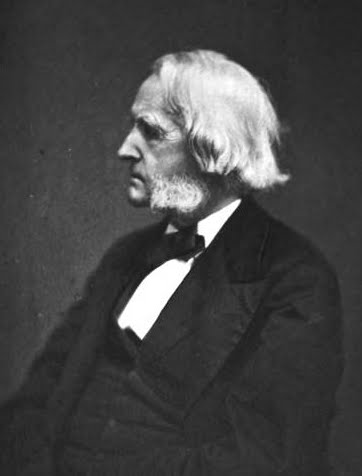
Nominee	George N. Briggs	Isaac Davis	Samuel E. Sewall
Party	Whig	Democratic	Liberty
Popular vote	54,813	33,199	9,997
Percentage	53.78%	32.58%	9.81%
- County results Briggs: 40–50% 50–60% 60–70% 70–80%
Governor before election
George N. Briggs
Whig
Elected Governor
George N. Briggs
Whig

The 1846 Massachusetts gubernatorial election was held on November 9.

Incumbent Whig Governor George N. Briggs was re-elected to a fourth term in office over Democrat Isaac Davis.

== General election ==
=== Candidates ===
- Francis Baylies, former U.S. chargé d'affaires in Buenos Aires and U.S. representative from Taunton (American)
- George N. Briggs, incumbent governor since 1844 (Whig)
- Isaac Davis, state senator from Worcester and candidate for governor in 1845 (Democratic)
- Samuel Edmund Sewall, Liberty nominee for governor since 1842 (Liberty)

=== Results ===
1846 Massachusetts gubernatorial election
Party	Candidate	Votes	%	±%
Whig	George N. Briggs (incumbent)	54,813	53.78%	▲5.03
Democratic	Isaac Davis	33,199	32.58%	▼2.75
Liberty	Samuel Edmund Sewall	9,997	9.81%	▲1.96
Know Nothing	Francis Baylies	3,423	3.36%	▼4.28
Write-in		484	0.48%	▲0.05
Total votes		101,916	100.00%	

== See also ==
- 1846 Massachusetts legislature
