= 1848–49 Massachusetts gubernatorial election =

- November 13, 1848 (popular election); January 8, 1849 (legislative vote)
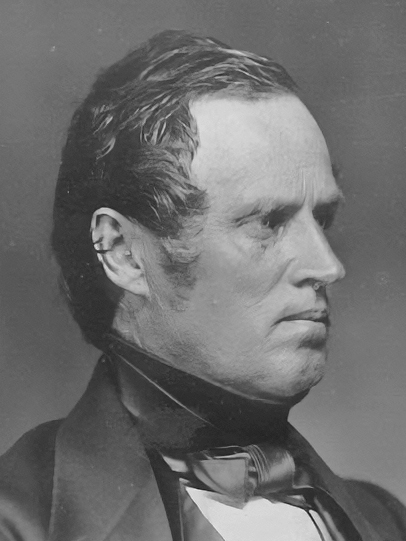

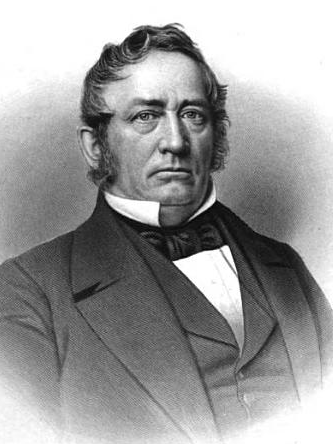

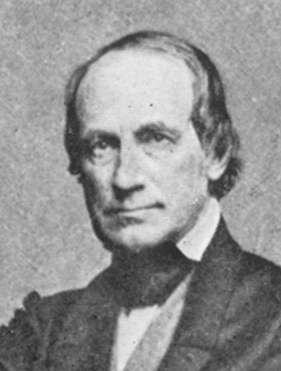
Nominee	George N. Briggs	Stephen C. Phillips	Caleb Cushing
Party	Whig	Free Soil	Democratic
Popular election	61,640; 49.69%	36,011; 29.03%	25,323; 20.41%
Senate vote	unanimous 100%
- Popular election results by county Briggs: 40–50% 50–60% 60–70% Phillips: 40–50%
Governor before election
George N. Briggs
Whig
Elected Governor
George N. Briggs
Whig

The 1848–49 Massachusetts gubernatorial election consisted of an initial popular election held on November 13, 1848 that was followed by a legislative vote held on January 8, 1949. Incumbent Whig Governor George N. Briggs was reelected.

== Democratic nomination ==
The Democratic convention was held on September 6, 1848, at Worcester City Hall.

=== Results ===
Democratic gubernatorial nomination
Party	Candidate	Votes	%
Democratic	Caleb Cushing	382	60.0
Democratic	Frederick Robinson	220	34.5
Democratic	George S. Boutwell	16	2.5
Democratic	Robert Rantoul Jr.	11	1.7
Democratic	G. P. Osgood	4	6.3
Democratic	Benjamin F. Hallett	2	3.1
Democratic	Isaac Davis	1	1.6
Democratic	H. H. Childs	1	1.6
Total votes		637	

== Whig nomination ==
The Whig convention was held on September 13, 1848, at Worcester. Governor George N. Briggs and Lieutenant Governor John Reed Jr. were re-nominated by acclamation.

== General election ==
=== Candidates ===
- George N. Briggs, Whig, incumbent governor
- Caleb Cushing, Democratic, former U.S. representative, former U.S. minister to China
- Stephen C. Phillips, Free Soil, former U.S. representative, former mayor of Salem, Massachusetts
- Frederick Robinson, Independent Democrat, warden of the Massachusetts State Prison, former president of the Massachusetts Senate

=== Results ===
1848 Massachusetts gubernatorial election
Party	Candidate	Votes	%	±%
Whig	George N. Briggs	61,640	49.69%	
Free Soil	Stephen C. Phillips	36,011	29.03%	
Democratic	Caleb Cushing	25,323	20.41%	
Independent Democrat	Frederick Robinson	475	0.38%	
Scattering		606	0.49%	
Majority		25,629	20.66%	
Turnout		124,055		

=== Legislative election ===
As no candidate received a majority of the vote, the Massachusetts General Court was required to decide the election. Under Article III of the Constitution of Massachusetts, the House of Representatives chose two candidates from the top four vote-getters, the Senate electing the governor from the House's choice.

The legislative election was held on January 8, 1849.

Legislative election
Party	Candidate	Votes	%
Whig	George N. Briggs	unanimous	
Whig hold			
