= Dale General Hospital =

Former hospital in Massachusetts

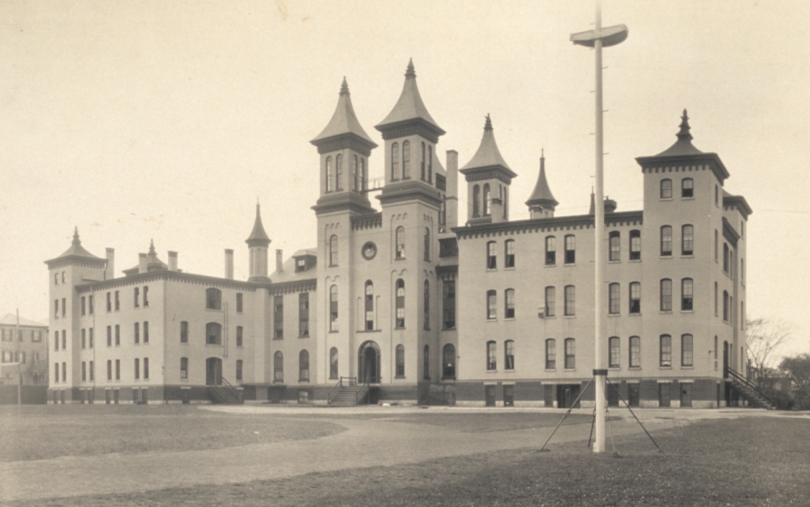
- Former names: Botanic Medical School, Eclectic Medical College, Worcester Female Seminary
- Alternative names: Davis Hall, Worcester Academy

General information
- Status: Demolished
- Type: Dormitory
- Architectural style: Richardsonian Romanesque
- Location: Providence Street, Worcester, Massachusetts
- Completed: 1852
- Demolished: 1965
- Affiliation: Worcester Academy

Design and construction
- Architect: Elbridge Boyden
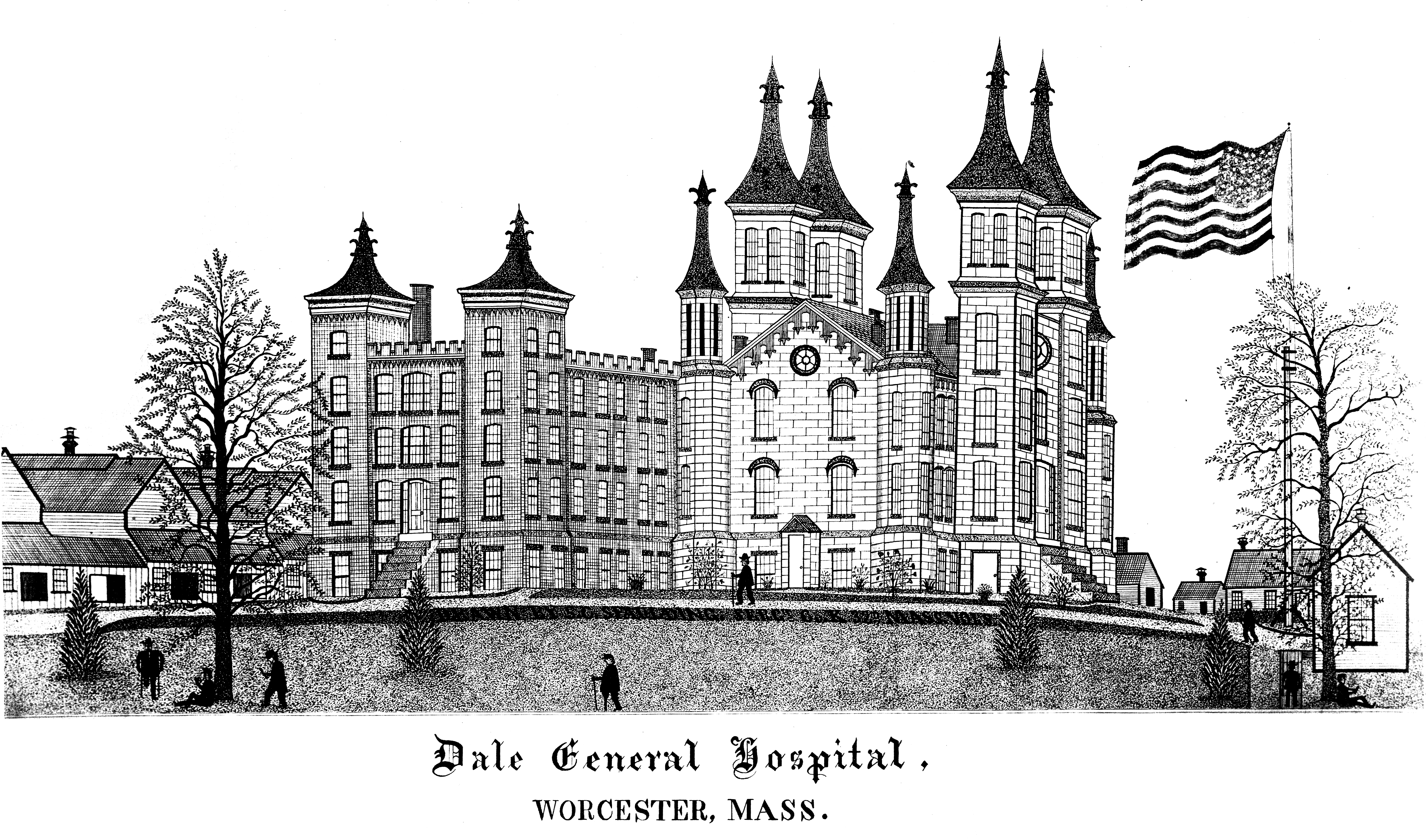
- Dale General Hospital

Organisation
- Type: Specialist

Services
- Speciality: Military

History
- Opened: 1864
- Closed: 1865

The Dale General Hospital, located in Worcester, Massachusetts, was set up by the Federal Government to care for Union soldiers principally from Massachusetts regiments.

== History ==
The elaborate turreted Romanesque building on Providence Street was designed by local architect Elbridge Boyden in 1852. It was originally built for the use of the Botanic Medical School (also called the Eclectic Medical College). Later the building was occupied by the Worcester Female Seminary (also called the Ladies’ Collegiate Institute). The Institute closed during the panic of 1857, leaving the building unoccupied.

=== Civil War hospital ===
During the American Civil War, there was great community pressure to open a General Hospital in Massachusetts to care for Union Army soldiers from local regiments. The Surgeon General of Massachusetts, William J. Dale, M.D., pressured Governor John Albion Andrew and the state's senators and congressional delegation to open such a hospital. In 1864 the War Department ordered that the abandoned building on Providence Street be leased for this purpose.

To house the patients, fourteen pavilions were erected behind the existing building. Each pavilion or barrack was 25 feet (7.6 m) wide, 160 feet (49 m) in length and 14 feet (4.3 m) high at the tip of its pitched roof. The former college was used by the physicians, administrators, and staff.

The first patients were admitted in October, 1864 and the formal dedication took place on Washington's Birthday in the following year. Overall, the hospital treated 1,182 patients. Soon after the close of the Civil War, the government terminated the lease and auctioned the barracks and their contents. The Dale General Hospital had a life span of fourteen months.

=== Davis building, Worcester Academy ===
In 1869, Isaac Davis, former mayor of Worcester and longtime trustee of Worcester Academy, acquired the building for use by the school. It was renamed Davis Hall in his honor. Davis Hall was Worcester Academy's only building for many years; at times, it served as a dormitory, reputedly haunted by ghosts of Civil War soldiers.

One of the building's towers was toppled in the 1938 New England hurricane; the entire structure was demolished in 1965. Davol Hall dormitory was built in roughly the same location.
