= 1843–44 Massachusetts gubernatorial election =

- November 13, 1843
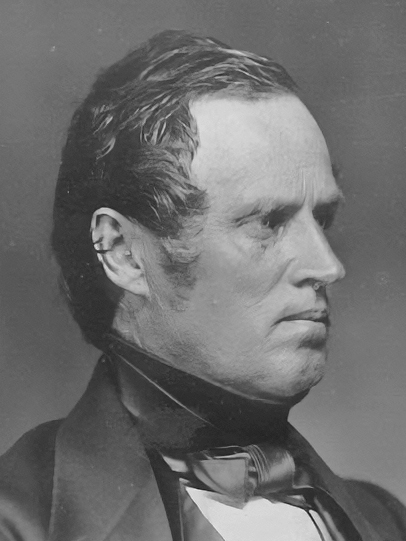

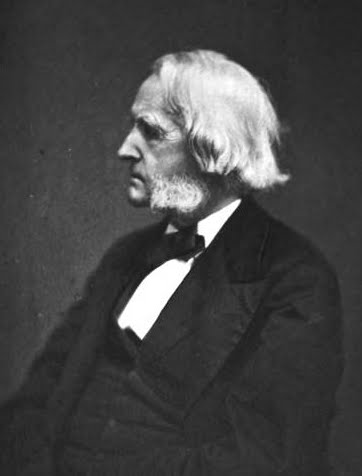
Nominee	George N. Briggs	Marcus Morton	Samuel E. Sewall
Party	Whig	Democratic	Liberty
Electoral vote	30	6	—
Popular vote	57,899	54,242	8,901
Percentage	47.74%	44.72%	7.34%
- Popular election results by county Briggs: 40–50% 50–60% 60–70% Morton: 40–50% 50–60%
Governor before election
Marcus Morton
Democratic
Elected Governor
George N. Briggs
Whig

The 1843–44 Massachusetts gubernatorial election was held on November 13, 1843. The result of the election was inconclusive, as no candidate won a majority of the popular vote. The Massachusetts General Court held a contingent election on January 8, 1844, in which the Whig Party nominee George N. Briggs defeated the incumbent Democratic governor Marcus Morton.

== General election ==
=== Candidates ===
- Marcus Morton, incumbent governor (Democratic)
- George N. Briggs, former U.S. representative from Massachusetts's 7th congressional district (Whig)
- Samuel E. Sewall, attorney and editor of American Jurist (Liberty)

=== Results ===
1843 Massachusetts gubernatorial election
Party	Candidate	Votes	%	±%
Whig	George N. Briggs	57,899	47.74%	▲1.18
Democratic	Marcus Morton	54,242	44.72%	▼3.16
Liberty	Samuel E. Sewall	8,901	7.34%	▲1.93
Write-in		246	0.20%	▲0.05
Majority		3,657	3.02%	
Turnout		121,288		

== Contingent election ==
As no candidate received a majority of the vote, the General Court held a contingent election on January 8, 1844. The Massachusetts House of Representatives nominated Briggs and Morton from among the four most-voted candidates. The Massachusetts Senate then voted to elect Briggs by a majority of 24 votes.

1844 Massachusetts gubernatorial contingent election
Party	Candidate	Votes	%
Whig	George N. Briggs	30	80.00%
Democratic	Marcus Morton	6	20.00%
Total votes		36	100.00%
Whig gain from Democratic			

== Bibliography ==
- Dubin, Michael J. (2003). United States Gubernatorial Elections, 1776–1860: The Official Results by State and County. Jefferson, NC: McFarland and Company. ISBN 978-0-7864-1439-0.
- Kallenbach, Joseph E.; Kallenbach, Jessamine S., eds. (1977). American State Governors, 1776–1976. Vol. 1. Dobbs Ferry, N.Y.: Oceana Publications. ISBN 0-379-00665-0.
