= 1842 Massachusetts gubernatorial election =

- November 14, 1842

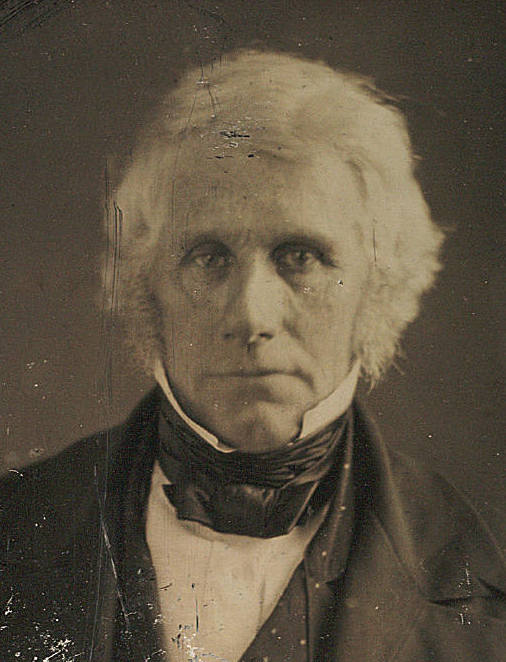

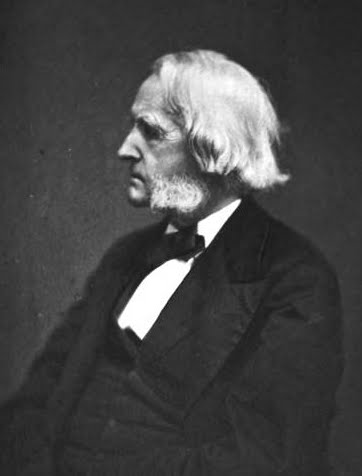
| Nominee | Marcus Morton | John Davis | Samuel E. Sewall |
| Party | Democratic | Whig | Liberty |
| Electoral vote | 27 | 11 | — |
| Popular vote | 56,491 | 54,939 | 6,382 |
| Percentage | 47.88% | 46.56% | 5.41% |
- County results Morton: 40–50% 50–60% Davis: 40–50% 50–60%
Governor before election
John Davis
Whig
Elected Governor
Marcus Morton
Democratic

The 1842 Massachusetts gubernatorial election consisted of an initial popular election held on November 14, 1842, that was followed by a legislative vote held on January 17, 1843. The ultimate task of electing the governor had been placed before the Massachusetts General Court because no candidate received the majority of the vote that was constitutionally required for a candidate to be elected through the popular election. Incumbent Whig Governor John Davis was defeated by Democratic nominee and former Governor Marcus Morton.

== General election ==
=== Candidates ===
- John Davis, incumbent governor since 1841 (Note: Davis had previously served as governor from 1834 to 1835.) and former U.S. senator (Whig)
- Marcus Morton, former governor (Democratic)
- Samuel E. Sewall, attorney and editor of American Jurist (Liberty)

=== Results ===
1842 Massachusetts gubernatorial election
| Party | Candidate | Votes | % | ±% |
|---|---|---|---|---|
| Democratic | Marcus Morton | 56,491 | 47.88% | ▲1.63 |
| Whig | John Davis | 54,939 | 46.56% | ▼3.84 |
| Liberty | Samuel E. Sewall | 6,382 | 5.41% | ▲2.27 |
| Write-in | | 180 | 0.15% | ▼0.06 |
| Majority | | 1,552 | 1.32% | |
| Turnout | | 117,992 | | |

=== Legislative vote ===
As no candidate received a majority of the vote, the Massachusetts House of Representatives was required to nominate two of the four top vote-getters to the Massachusetts Senate, which then chose one of the two as governor. The House nominated Davis and Morton. The election in the Senate was held on January 17, 1843.

Legislative election
| Party | Candidate | Votes | % |
|---|---|---|---|
| Democratic | Marcus Morton | 27 | 71.1 |
| Whig | John Davis | 11 | 28.9 |
| Turnout | | 38 | |
| Democratic gain from Whig | | | |

== Bibliography ==
- Kallenbach, Joseph E.; Kallenbach, Jessamine S., eds. (1977). American State Governors, 1776-1976. Vol. I. Dobbs Ferry, N.Y.: Oceana Publications, Inc. ISBN 0-379-00665-0.
