= 1861 Massachusetts gubernatorial election =

- November 5, 1861
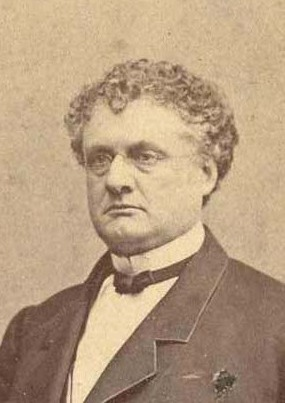

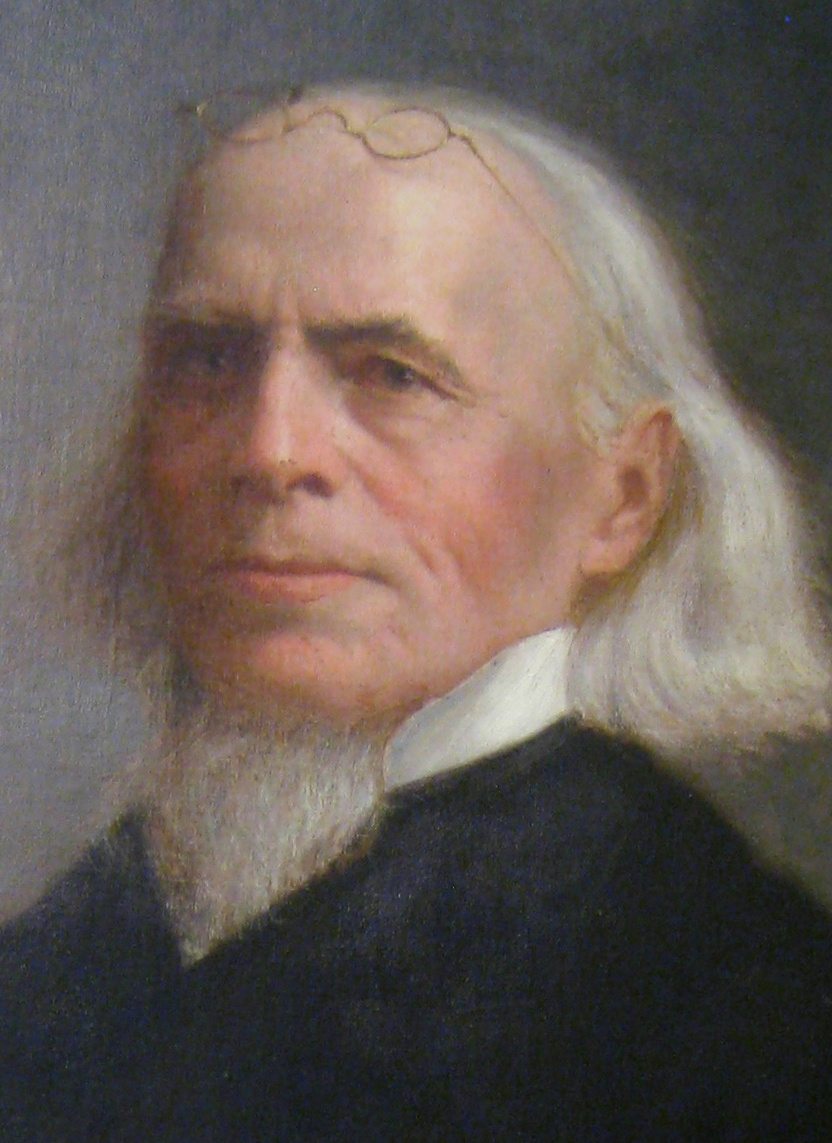
Nominee	John Albion Andrew	Isaac Davis
Party	Republican	Democratic
Popular vote	65,261	31,264
Percentage	67.61%	32.39%
- County results Andrew: 50–60% 60–70% 70–80% 80–90%
Governor before election
John Albion Andrew
Republican
Elected Governor
John Albion Andrew
Republican

The 1861 Massachusetts gubernatorial election was held on November 5. Governor John Albion Andrew was re-elected to a second term in office over Democratic Mayor of Worcester Isaac Davis.

== General election ==
=== Candidates ===
- John Albion Andrew, governor of Massachusetts since 1861 (Republican)
- Isaac Davis, mayor of Worcester (Democratic)

=== Results ===
1861 Massachusetts gubernatorial election
Party	Candidate	Votes	%	±%
Republican	John Albion Andrew (incumbent)	65,261	67.61	▲2.12
Democratic	Isaac Davis	31,264	32.39	▲11.64
Total votes		96,525	100.00	
Republican hold		Swing		
