= 1844 Massachusetts gubernatorial election =

- November 11, 1844
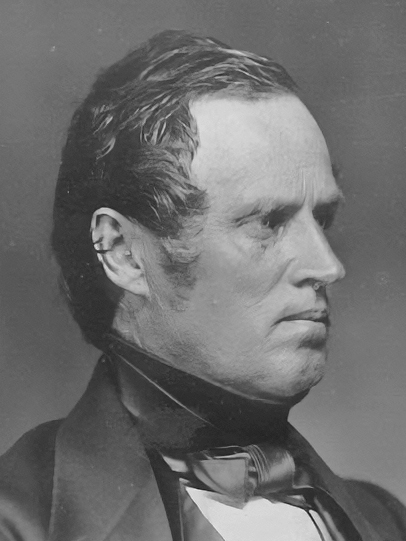

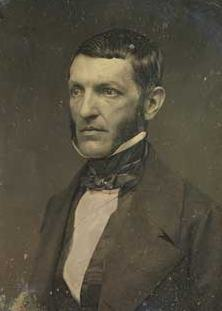

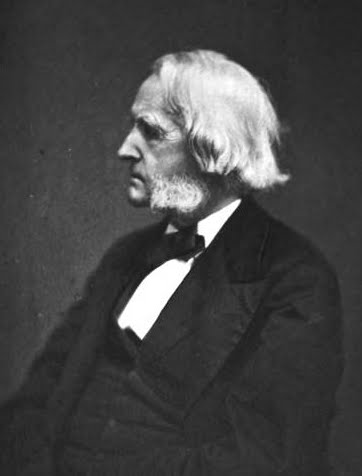
Nominee	George N. Briggs	George Bancroft	Samuel E. Sewall
Party	Whig	Democratic	Liberty
Popular vote	69,570	54,714	9,634
Percentage	51.83%	40.76%	7.18%
- County results Briggs: 40–50% 50–60% 60–70% Bancroft: 40–50%
Governor before election
George N. Briggs
Whig
Elected Governor
George N. Briggs
Whig

The 1844 Massachusetts gubernatorial election was held on November 11.

Incumbent Whig Governor George N. Briggs was re-elected to a second term in office over Democrat George Bancroft.

== General election ==
=== Candidates ===
- George Bancroft, historian and former collector of the Port of Boston (Democratic)
- George N. Briggs, incumbent governor since January 1844 (Whig)
- Samuel Edmund Sewall, attorney and Liberty nominee for governor since 1842 (Liberty)

=== Results ===
1844 Massachusetts gubernatorial election
Party	Candidate	Votes	%	±%
Whig	George N. Briggs (incumbent)	69,570	51.83%	▲4.09
Democratic	George Bancroft	54,714	40.76%	▼3.96
Liberty	Samuel Edmund Sewall	9,635	7.18%	▼0.16
Write-in		306	0.23%	▲0.03
Total votes		134,225	100.00%	

== See also ==
- 1844 Massachusetts legislature
