= 1859 Massachusetts gubernatorial election =

- November 2, 1859
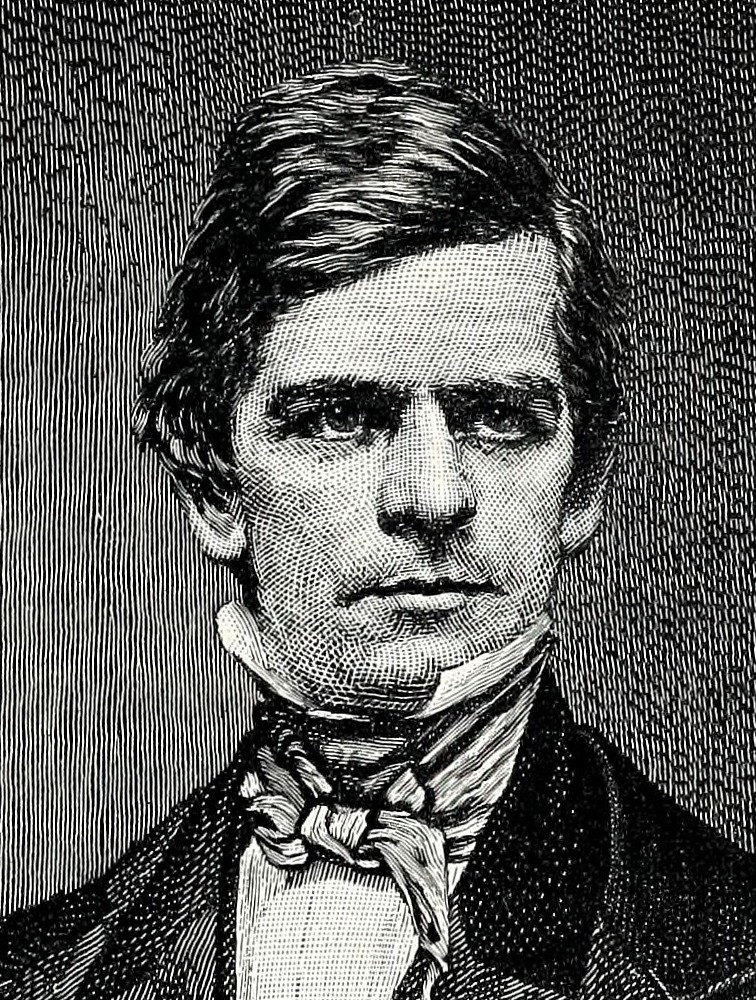

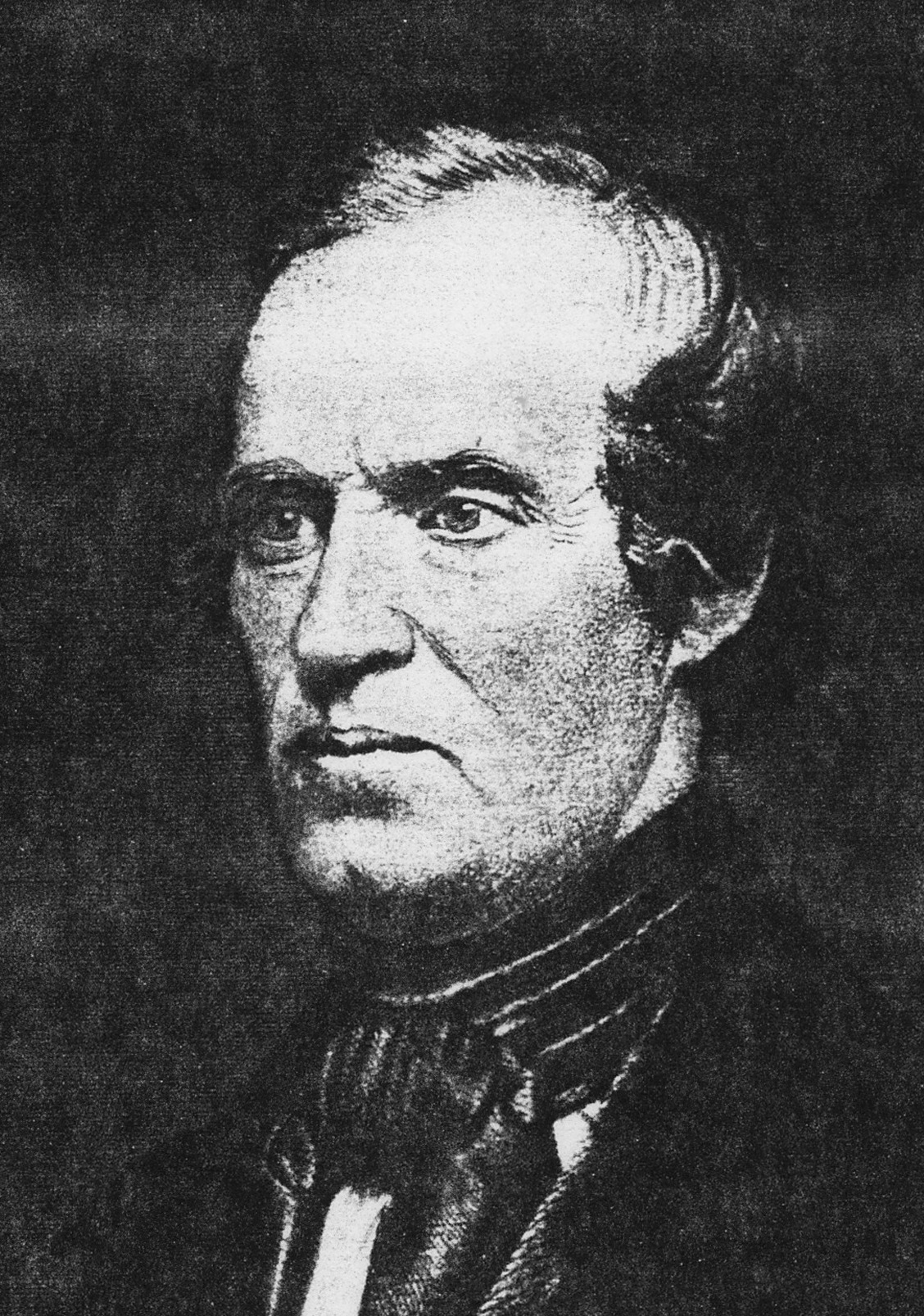
Nominee	Nathaniel Banks	Benjamin Butler	George N. Briggs
Party	Republican	Democratic	Know Nothing
Popular vote	58,804	35,326	14,365
Percentage	54.02%	32.45%	13.20%
- County results Banks: 40–50% 50–60% 60–70%
Governor before election
Nathaniel Prentiss Banks
Republican
Elected Governor
Nathaniel Prentiss Banks
Republican

The 1859 Massachusetts gubernatorial elections was held on November 2. Incumbent Republican governor Nathaniel Banks was easily re-elected to a third term in office in a race featuring three governors of Massachusetts: incumbent governor Banks, former governor George Nixon Briggs (1844–51), and future governor Benjamin Franklin Butler (1882–83).

This was the last election in which the Know-Nothing participated.

== General election ==
=== Candidates ===
- Nathaniel Prentiss Banks, incumbent governor (Republican)
- George Nixon Briggs, former governor of Massachusetts (1844–51) (American)
- Benjamin Franklin Butler, state senator from Lowell (Democratic)

=== Results ===
1859 Massachusetts gubernatorial election
Party	Candidate	Votes	%	±%
Republican	Nathaniel Prentiss Banks (incumbent)	58,804	54.02%	▼3.59
Democratic	Benjamin Franklin Butler	35,326	32.45%	▲0.33
Know Nothing	George Nixon Briggs	14,365	13.20%	▲3.07
Total votes		108,140	100.00%	
Republican hold		Swing		

== See also ==
- 1859 Massachusetts legislature
