= Caleb Cushing =

American politician & diplomat (1800–1879)

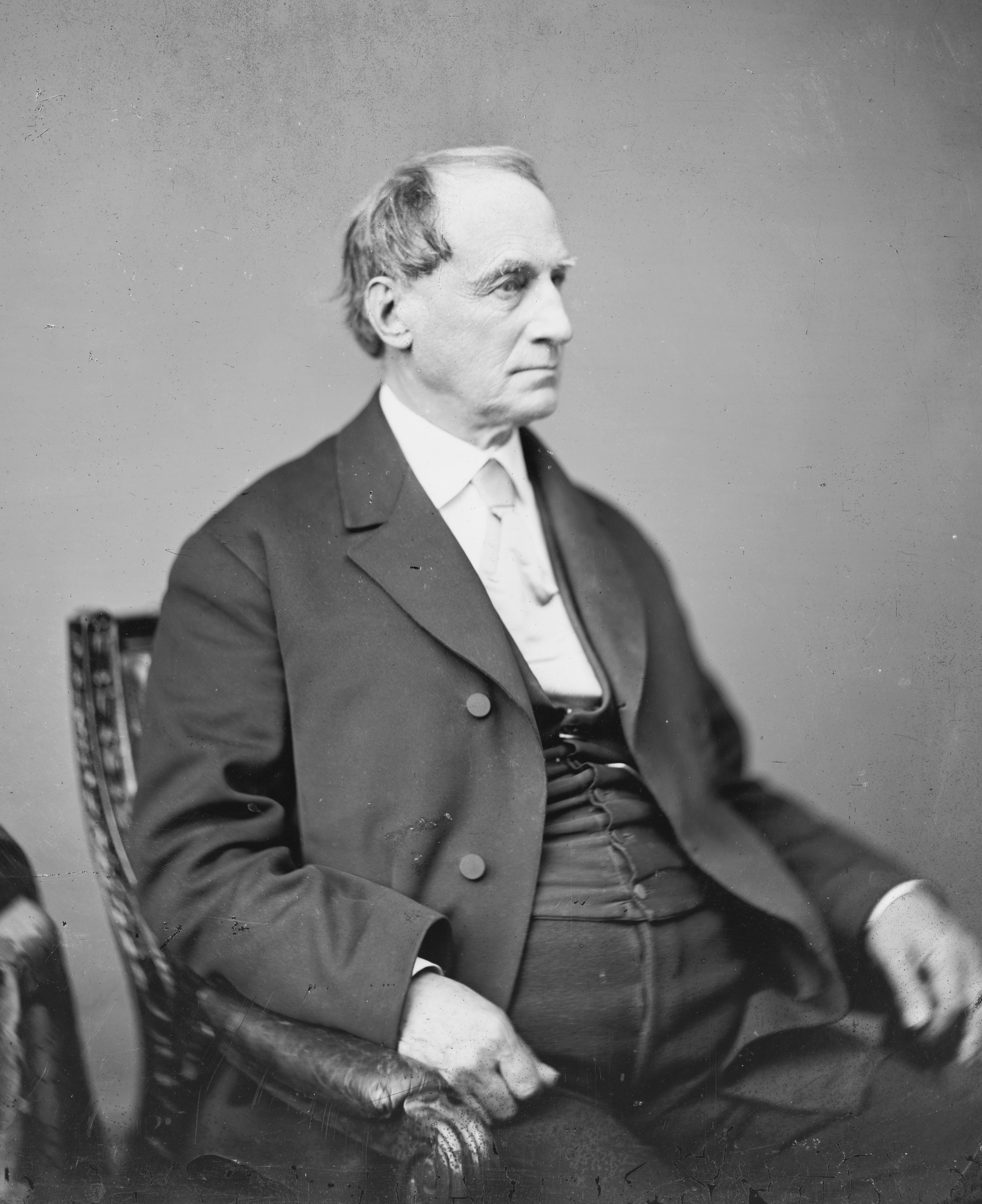

20th United States Minister to Spain
- In office May 30, 1874 – April 9, 1877
- President: Ulysses S. Grant; Rutherford B. Hayes
- Preceded by: Daniel Sickles
- Succeeded by: James Russell Lowell

23rd United States Attorney General
- In office March 7, 1853 – March 4, 1857
- President: Franklin Pierce
- Preceded by: John Crittenden
- Succeeded by: Jeremiah Black

Associate Justice of the Massachusetts Supreme Court
- In office 1852–1853
- Preceded by: Seat Established
- Succeeded by: Pliny Merrick

Mayor of Newburyport
- In office 1851–1852

1st United States Minister to China
- In office June 12, 1844 – August 27, 1844
- President: John Tyler
- Succeeded by: Alexander Everett

Member of the U.S. House of Representatives from Massachusetts's 3rd district
- In office March 4, 1835 – March 3, 1843
- Preceded by: Gayton Osgood
- Succeeded by: Amos Abbott

Member of the Massachusetts Senate
- In office 1826–1828

Member of the Massachusetts House of Representatives
- In office: 1825; 1828; 1833–1834; 1845–1847; 1851; 1858–1859; 1862–1863

Personal details
- Born: January 17, 1800 Salisbury, Massachusetts, U.S.
- Died: January 2, 1879 (aged 78) Newburyport, Massachusetts, U.S.
- Party: Democratic-Republican (before 1825); National Republican (1825‍–‍1833); Whig (1833–1847); Democratic (1847–1879)
- Spouse: Caroline Wilde (m. 1824)
- Education: Harvard University (AB)
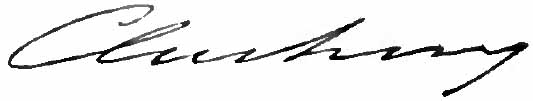
- Signature

Military service
- Branch: U.S. Army
- Service years: 1847–1848
- Rank: Brigadier General
- Unit: 1st Massachusetts Volunteer Rgt
- Conflict: Mexican-American War

Caleb Cushing (January 17, 1800 – January 2, 1879) was an American Democratic politician and diplomat who served as a Member of the U.S. House of Representatives from Massachusetts and the 23rd United States Attorney General under President Franklin Pierce. From 1874 until 1877, he was the United States Minister to Spain.

Cushing was an eager proponent of territorial and commercial expansion, especially regarding the acquisition of Texas, Oregon and Cuba. He believed that enlarging the American sphere would fulfill "the great destiny reserved for this exemplar American Republic." Cushing secured the first American treaty with China, the Treaty of Wangxia of 1844; it gave American merchants trading rights in five Chinese ports. After the Civil War, Cushing negotiated a treaty with Colombia to give the United States a right-of-way for a trans-oceanic Canal. He helped obtain a favorable settlement of the Alabama Claims, and as the ambassador to Spain in 1870s defused the troublesome Virginius Affair.

== Biography ==
=== Early life ===
Cushing was born in Salisbury, Massachusetts, on January 17, 1800; he was the son of John Newmarch Cushing, a wealthy shipbuilder and merchant, and Lydia Dow, a delicate and sensitive woman from Seabrook, New Hampshire, who died when he was ten. The family moved across the Merrimack River to the prosperous shipping town of Newburyport, Massachusetts, in 1802. He entered Harvard University at the age of 13 and graduated in 1817. He was a teacher of mathematics there from 1820 to 1821, and was admitted to practice in the Massachusetts Court of Common Pleas in December 1821; he began practicing law in Newburyport in 1824. There he attended the First Presbyterian Church.

On November 23, 1824, Cushing married Caroline Elizabeth Wilde, daughter of Judge Samuel Sumner Wilde, of the Massachusetts Supreme Judicial Court. His wife died about a decade later, leaving him childless and alone. He never married again.

=== State legislature ===
Cushing served as a Democratic-Republican member of the Massachusetts House of Representatives in 1825, then entered the Massachusetts Senate in 1826, and returned to the House in 1828. Afterwards, he spent two years in Europe from 1829 to 1831. Upon his return, he again served in the lower house of the state legislature in 1833 and 1834. Then, in late 1834, he was elected to the United States House of Representatives.

=== Washington career ===
Cushing served in Congress from 1835 until 1843 (the 24th, 25th, 26th and 27th Congresses). During the 27th Congress, he was chairman of the U.S. House Committee on Foreign Affairs.

Here the marked inconsistency characterizing his public life became manifest. For when John Tyler had become president, had been read out of the Whig party, and had vetoed Whig measures (including a tariff bill) for which Cushing had voted, Cushing first defended the vetoes and then voted again for the bills. In 1843 President Tyler nominated Cushing for U.S. Secretary of the Treasury, but the U.S. Senate refused to confirm him for this office. He was nominated three times in one day, and rejected all three times. John Canfield Spencer was chosen instead.

=== China mission ===
In 1843, Cushing was appointed by President Tyler to be commissioner and United States Minister to China, holding this position until March 4, 1845. With the goal of impressing the Royal Chinese court, the Cushing mission consisted of four American warships, loaded with gifts that exalted scientific wonders including revolvers, telescope, and an encyclopedia. His arrival at Macau in February 1844 created a local sensation, but the Chinese government was reluctant to designate another most favored nation. Cushing cleverly mixed the carrot and stick. He warned – against the backdrop of his warships – that not to receive an envoy was a national insult. He threatened to go directly to the Emperor – an unheard of procedure. The Emperor tried delay, but he finally sent an envoy to negotiate with Cushing, leading to the signing of the Treaty of Wanghia in the village of Wanghia on July 3, 1844. In addition to most favored nation status, Cushing made sure that Americans received extraterritoriality. In the following years American trade with China grew rapidly, thanks to the high-speed clipper ships which carried relatively small amounts of high-value cargo, such as ginseng and silk. American Protestant missionaries also began to arrive. The popular Chinese reaction was mostly hostile, but there was a favorable element that provided a base of support for American missionaries and businessmen. By 1850–1864, China was enmeshed in the Taiping Rebellion, a civil war which caused millions of deaths; foreign trade stagnated.

While serving as commissioner to China he was also empowered to negotiate a treaty of navigation and commerce with Japan.

=== Return to Massachusetts ===
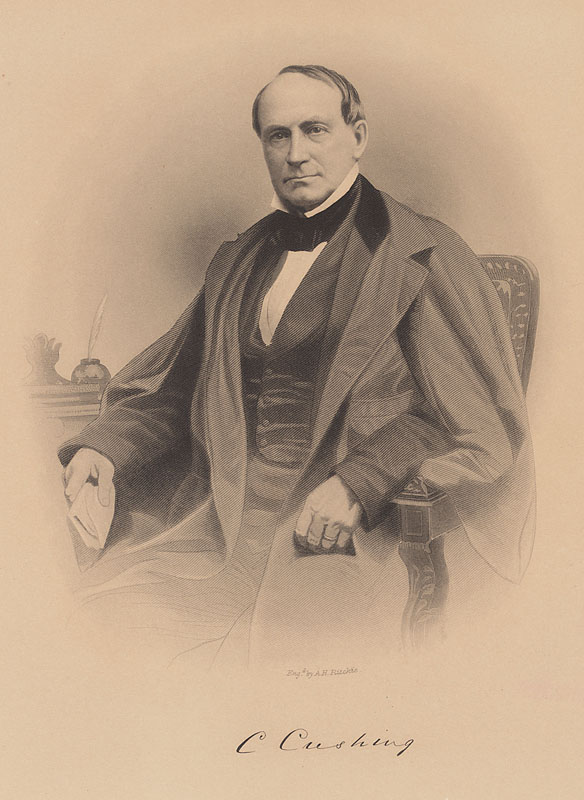
Engraving of Caleb Cushing

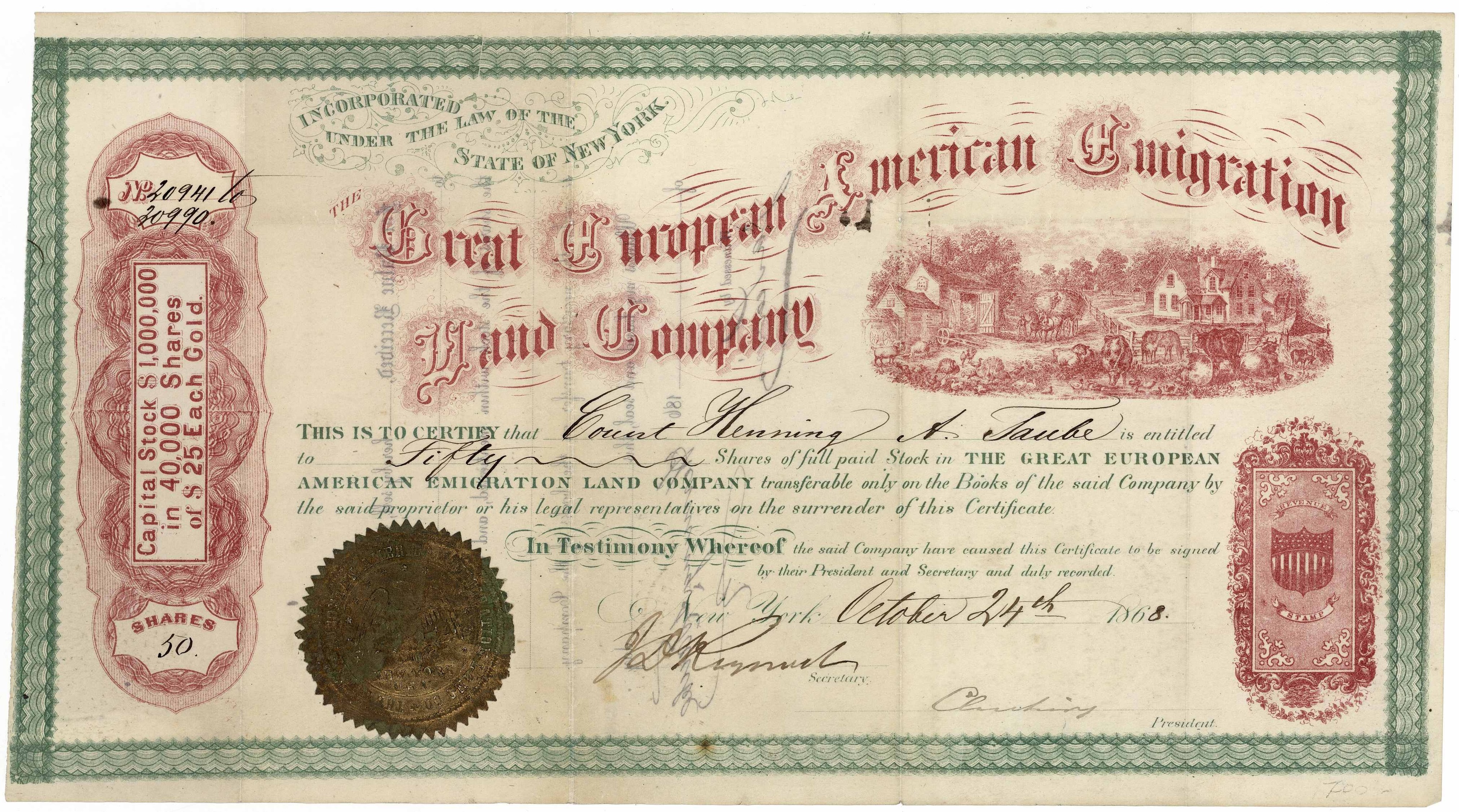
Share of the Great European American Emigration Land Company, issued 2. October 1868, signed by president Caleb Cushing.

In 1847, while again a representative in the Massachusetts state legislature, he introduced a bill appropriating money for the equipment of a regiment to serve in the Mexican–American War; although the bill was defeated, he raised the necessary funds privately.

He served in the Army during the Mexican War first as colonel of the 1st Massachusetts Volunteer Regiment, of which he was placed in command on January 15, 1847. He was promoted to brigadier-general of volunteers on April 14 of the same year. He did not see combat during this conflict, and entered Mexico City with his reserve battalion several months after that city had been pacified. He was discharged from the Army on July 20, 1848.

In 1847 and again in 1848 the Democrats nominated him for Governor of Massachusetts, but on each occasion he was defeated at the polls. He was again a representative in the state legislature in 1851, was offered the position as Massachusetts Attorney General in 1851, but declined; and served as mayor of Newburyport in 1851 and 1852. (He had written a major history of the town when he was 26 years old.)

He became an associate justice of the Massachusetts Supreme Judicial Court in 1852 until 1853. During the presidency Franklin Pierce, from March 7, 1853, until March 3, 1857, he was Attorney General of the United States. Cushing supported the March 1857 Dred Scott decision.

In 1858, 1859, 1862, and 1863 he again served in the Massachusetts House of Representatives.

Also during this time, he founded the Cushing Land Agency in St. Croix Falls, Wisconsin. The building it was housed in, now known as the Cushing Land Agency Building, is listed on the National Register of Historic Places.

=== 1860 and the Civil War ===
In 1860 he presided over the Democratic National Convention, which met first at Charleston and later at Baltimore, until he joined those who seceded from the regular convention. He then presided also over the convention of the seceding delegates, who nominated John C. Breckinridge for the Presidency. Also in 1860 President James Buchanan sent him to Charleston as Confidential Commissioner to the Secessionists of South Carolina.

Despite having favored states' rights and opposed the abolition of slavery, during the Civil War, he supported the Union. He was later appointed by President Andrew Johnson as one of three commissioners assigned to revise and codify the laws of the United States Congress. He served in that capacity from 1866 to 1870.

=== Return to diplomacy ===
In 1868, in concert with the Minister Resident to Colombia, Cushing was sent to Bogotá, Colombia, and worked to negotiate a right-of-way treaty for a ship canal across the Isthmus of Panama.

At the Geneva conference for the settlement of the Alabama claims in 1871–1872 he was one of the counsels appointed by President Ulysses S. Grant for the United States before the Geneva Tribunal of Arbitration on the Alabama claims.

From January 6, 1874, to April 9, 1877, Cushing was Minister to Spain. He defused tensions over the Virginius Affair, and proved popular in the country.

=== Supreme Court nomination ===
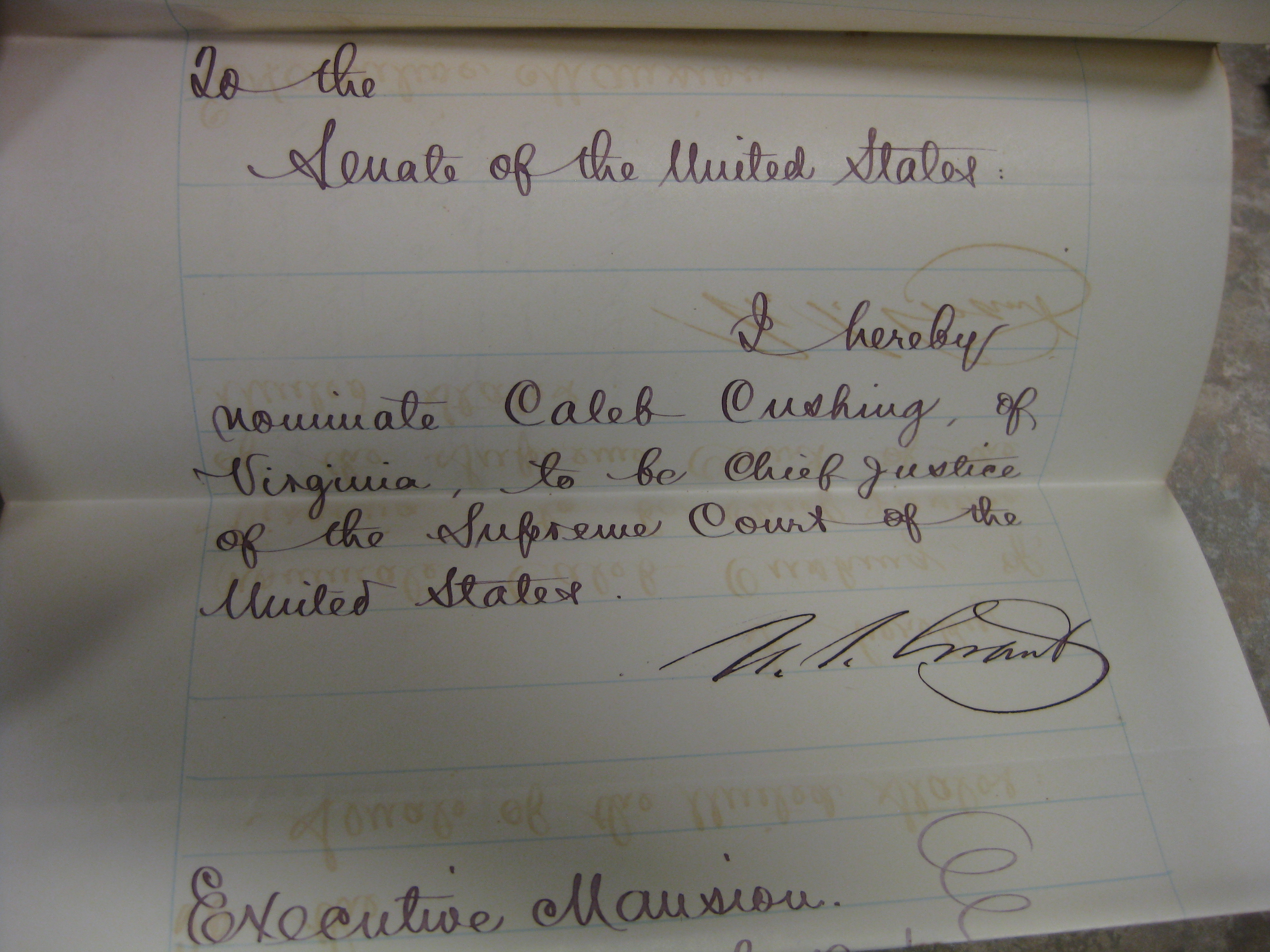
Cushing's Chief Justice nomination

On January 9, 1874, Grant nominated Cushing as Chief Justice of the United States Supreme Court. The nomination came soon after Grant withdrew the nomination of George Henry Williams to the position. The selection caught many off-guard, including Cushing himself. Radical Republicans in the U.S. Senate immediately challenged Cushing's loyalties on account of his earlier close personal rapport with Andrew Johnson and his alleged pre-Civil War Copperhead sympathies. Their feelings of distrust turned into all out opposition to his confirmation when a (non-political) letter that Cushing had written in 1861 to President of the Confederacy Jefferson Davis was found and made public. As a result of rising furor, the nomination was withdrawn on January 13, 1874.

== Death and legacy ==
Cushing died in Newburyport on January 2, 1879, where he was laid to rest in the town's Highland Cemetery.

The United States Revenue Cutter Caleb Cushing was named after Cushing. The Caleb Cushing served during the American Civil War and was destroyed by Confederate raiders during the Battle of Portland Harbor on June 27, 1863.

== Works ==
- To the members of the senior class, Harvard University (1821)
- An oration, delivered in Newburyport : on the forty-fifth anniversary of American independence, July 4, 1821
- History and Present State of the Town of Newburyport, Mass. (1826)
- An oration delivered before the citizens of Newburyport : on the fifty-sixth anniversary of American independence (1832)
- An oration pronounced at Boston before the Colonization Society of Massachusetts : on the anniversary of American independence, July 4, 1833
- Reminiscences of Spain (1833);
- Review, historical and political, of the late revolution in France, and of the consequent events in Belgium, Poland, Great Britain, and other parts of Europe, two volumes, (1833)
- Introductory discourse delivered before the American Institute of Instruction, at their fifth anniversary meeting, in Boston, August 1834
- An oration pronounced before the literary societies of Amherst College, August 23, 1836
- Oration on the Material Growth and Territorial Progress of the United States (1839)
- Life and Public Services of William H. Harrison (1840)
- Speech of Mr. Cushing, of Massachusetts, on the case of Alexander McLeod : delivered in the House of Representatives, June 24 and 25, 1841
- An address, delivered at the laying of the corner stone of the new town hall, Newburyport 1850
- Address. Delivered September 26, 1850, at Salem, before the Essex agricultural society
- Speech delivered in Faneuil Hall, Boston, October 27, 1857 : also, speech delivered in City Hall, Newburyport, October 31, 1857
- Oration delivered by the Hon. Caleb Cushing, of Massachusetts, before the Tammany society, or Columbian order, at Tammany hall, on Monday, July 5th, 1858
- The Union and the Constitution. Public meeting in Faneuil Hall, Boston, Dec. 8, 1859. Speeches of Hon. Levi Lincoln, Hon. Edward Everett, Hon. Caleb Cushing
- Speech of Hon. Caleb Cushing, in Norombega hall, Bangor, October 2, 1860, before the Democracy of Maine
- The Treaty of Washington (1873)

== See also ==
- Unsuccessful nominations to the Cabinet of the United States

U.S. House of Representatives
Preceded by Gayton Osgood	Member of the U.S. House of Representatives from Massachusetts's 3rd congressional district 1835–1843	Succeeded by Amos Abbott
Preceded by Francis Pickens	Chair of the House Foreign Affairs Committee; 1841–1842	Succeeded by John Quincy Adams
Diplomatic posts
New office	United States Minister to China; 1844	Succeeded by Alexander Everett
Preceded by Daniel Sickles	United States Minister to Spain; 1874–1877	Succeeded by James Lowell
Party political offices
Preceded by Isaac Davis	Democratic nominee for Governor of Massachusetts; 1847, 1848	Succeeded by George Boutwell
Preceded by John Ward	Permanent Chair of the Democratic National Convention; 1860	Succeeded by David Tod
Legal offices
New seat	Associate Justice of the Massachusetts Supreme Judicial Court; 1852–1853	Succeeded by Pliny Merrick
Preceded by John Crittenden	United States Attorney General; 1853–1857	Succeeded by Jeremiah Black
