= Isaac Davis (lawyer) =

American lawyer & politician (1799–1883)

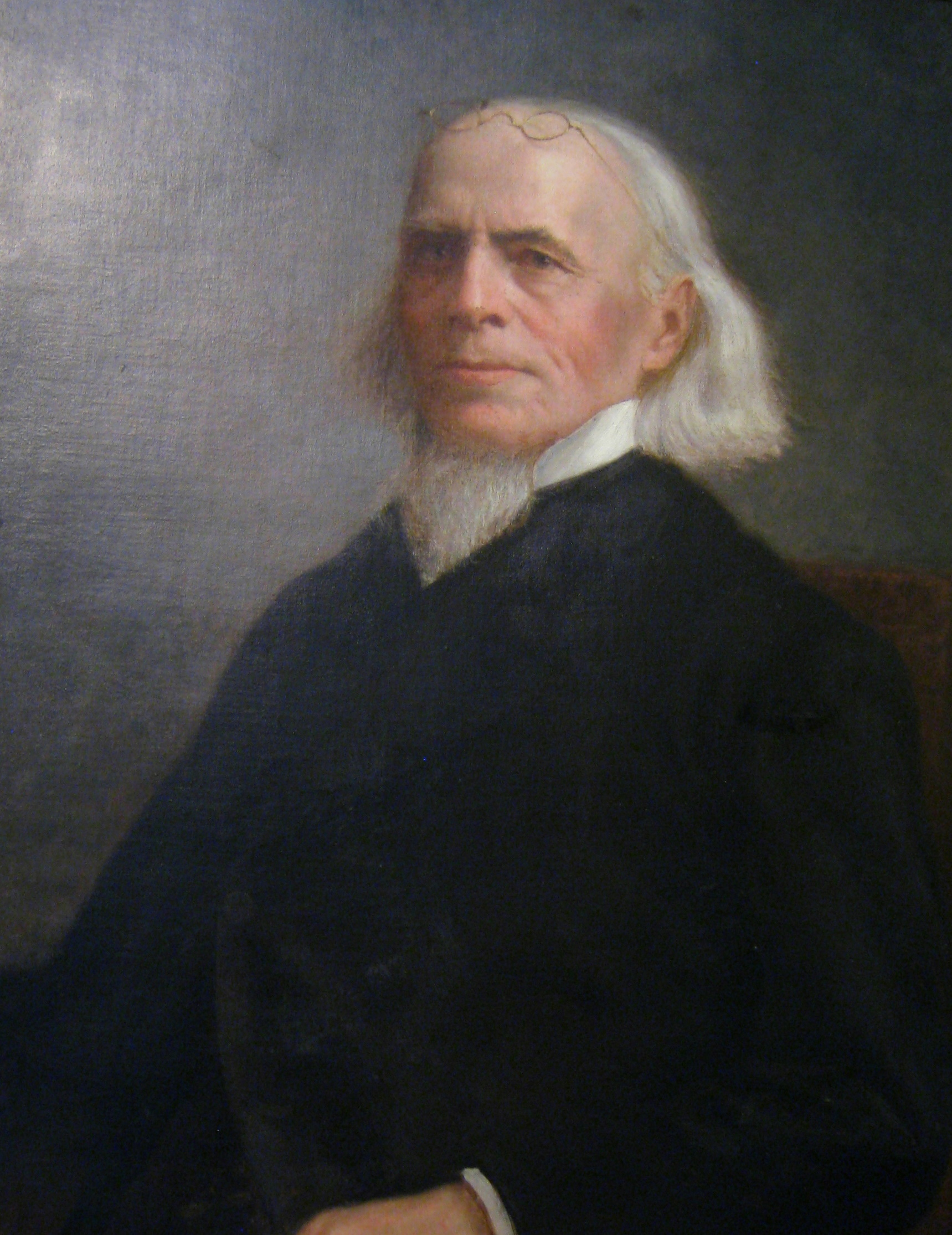

6th, 8th, and 11th Mayor of Worcester, Massachusetts
- In office January 7, 1856 – January 5, 1857
- Preceded by: George W. Richardson
- Succeeded by: George W. Richardson
- In office January 4, 1858 – January 3, 1859
- Preceded by: George W. Richardson
- Succeeded by: Alexander H. Bullock
- In office January 7, 1861 – January 6, 1862
- Preceded by: William W. Rice
- Succeeded by: P. Emory Aldrich

Member of the Massachusetts Senate
- In office 1843–1854

Personal details
- Born: June 2, 1799
- Died: April 1, 1883 (aged 83) Worcester, Massachusetts
- Education: Brown University
- Occupation: Attorney

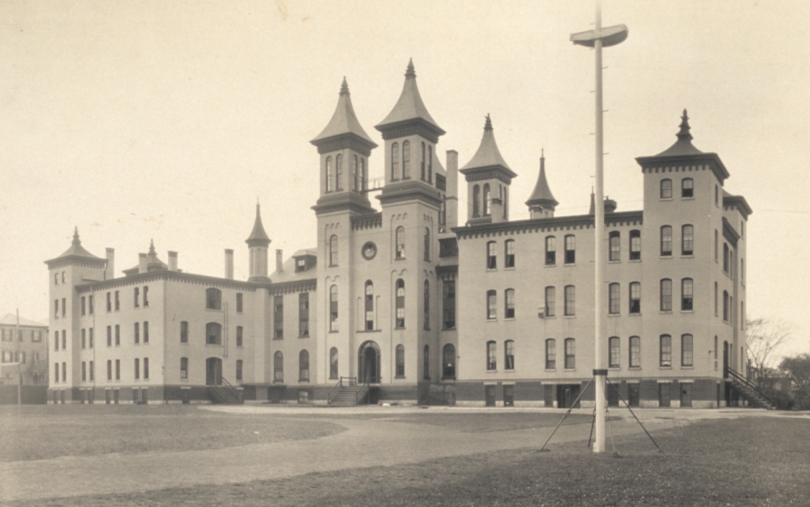
Dale General Hospital was purchased by Davis for Worcester Academy, and named Davis Hall in his honor. Demolished in 1965.

Isaac Davis (June 2, 1799 – April 1, 1883) was a lawyer and politician active in Worcester, Massachusetts.

== Biography ==
Davis was born in Northborough, Massachusetts, graduated from Brown University in 1822, studied law until admitted to the bar in 1825, and began the practice in Worcester, Massachusetts, where he soon rose to eminence. He was, from 1843 to 1854, a member of the Massachusetts Senate, and three times mayor of Worcester from 1856 to 1859, in 1858, and 1861. Davis also served on the boards of various banks and railroad companies.

Davis was a promoter of popular education. From 1838 to 1851 Davis was on the board of trustees of Brown University, and became a Fellow in 1851; Davis also was a trustee of Columbian College (now George Washington University), Norwich University, and Waterville College (now Colby College). Davis served as first President of the Worcester Academy Board of Trustees, from 1834 to 1873, and for some time was an active member of the Massachusetts Board of Education. He was president of the Worcester County Horticultural Society from 1844 to 1848. He was elected a member of the American Antiquarian Society in 1841, and later served on its board of councilors from 1850 to 1883.

Davis died in Worcester, Massachusetts, in 1883.

== See also ==
- Isaac Davis House

== Notes ==
Party political offices
| Preceded by George Bancroft | Democratic nominee for Governor of Massachusetts; 1845, 1846 | Succeeded by Caleb Cushing |
| Preceded by Erasmus D. Beach | Democratic nominee for Governor of Massachusetts; 1861 | Succeeded by Charles Devens |
