= Thankful Southwick =

American Quaker, abolitionist, and women's rights activist (1792–1867)

- Born: July 2, 1792; Portland, Maine
- Died: April 29, 1867 (aged 74); Grantville (Wellesley), Massachusetts
- Occupations: Abolitionist and women's rights activist
- Spouse: Joseph Southwick
- Children: Abby, Sarah, and Anna Southwick
- Parent(s): Samuel and Thankful Hussey

Thankful Southwick (July 2, 1792 – April 29, 1867) was an affluent Quaker abolitionist and women's rights activist in Boston, Massachusetts. Thankful was lifelong abolitionist who joined the Boston Female Anti-Slavery Society in 1835 with her three daughters. She was present at both the 1835 Boston Mob and the Abolition Riot of 1836. During the 1840 schism in the Boston Female Anti-Slavery Society, Thankful sided with the Westons, Chapmans, Childs, Sergeants, and other radical Garrisonians to reestablish the Boston Female Anti-Slavery Society. She also later joined the New England Non Resistance Society.

She held several elected offices within the Boston Female Anti-Slavery Society, including counselor in 1837, as well as president in 1840, 1841, 1842, and 1844. Thankful was also involved in the women's rights movement and was an attendee and signer of the call of the first National Women's Rights Convention held in Worcester, Massachusetts, in 1850. Thankful and Joseph Southwick's house was both a gathering place for fellow abolitionists and a stop on the Underground Railroad for fugitive slaves. During her years of activism in Boston, Thankful and her family were closely acquainted with notable abolitionists and women's rights activists, including William Lloyd Garrison, Elizabeth Cady Stanton, Frederick Douglass, Lydia Maria Child, Maria Weston Chapman, and George Thompson.

== Biography ==
=== Early life ===
Thankful Hussey Southwick was born on July 2, 1792, in Portland, Maine. Her father was Samuel F. Hussey, a Quaker and abolitionist. Samuel's abolitionist views were heavily informed by his trade as a merchant importing goods from England. Samuel learned of the antislavery movement occurring in England through pamphlets that his English correspondent and fellow Quaker James Cropper left in the goods he sent over from England. Samuel was a known friend of fugitive slaves and helped runaway slaves on their escape to freedom in Canada. Thankful inherited her abolitionist beliefs from her father. She had two sisters, Sarah Hussey and Comfort Hussey.

=== Marriage and children ===
On October 1, 1818, Thankful married Joseph Southwick of Portland, who was also an abolitionist. Thankful and Joseph had three children: Abigail Southwick, born in 1819; Sarah Hussey Southwick, born in 1821; and Anna Southwick, born in 1823. In 1834, the Southwick family moved to South Danvers (current day Peabody), Massachusetts. They later moved to Number 36 High Street in Boston in 1835.

- Abigail Southwick (born September 17, 1819, died 1856 or 1895), abolitionist and Representative at the 1840 World Anti-Slavery Convention.
- Sarah Southwick (born March 3, 1821, died March 12, 1896, in Wellesley), abolitionist and Recording Secretary for the Boston Female Anti-Slavery Society, author of Reminiscences of Early Anti-Slavery Days.
- Anna Southwick (born April 6, 1823, died July 10, 1911, in Wellesley), abolitionist who joined the Boston Female Anti-Slavery Society at age 12.

=== Death and legacy ===
Thankful died in her sleep at age 75 on April 29, 1867, in Grantville (current day Wellesley), Massachusetts. Her obituary was written by Lydia Maria Child and her eulogy was given by William Lloyd Garrison. Thankful and her husband were beloved and fondly remembered by their abolitionist and women's rights peers. In his Speech Before the International Council of Women, in Washington, D.C., in April 1888, Frederick Douglass remembered Thankful and Joseph as "two of the noblest people I ever knew."

Thankful, her husband, and their three daughters are buried near one another in Harmony Grove Cemetery in Salem, Massachusetts.

== Involvement in the abolitionist movement ==
=== Introduction to the Boston abolitionist movement ===
While the Southwicks did not know any families in Boston at the time of their move, the reputations of both Thankful and Joseph Southwick as devoted abolitionists preceded them. They quickly became acquainted with notable Boston abolitionist families and became heavily involved in the antislavery movement in the city. Thankful and her daughters became close friends with the Chapmans and Westons. Along with the Sergeants, the Chapmans, the Childs, and the Westons, Thankful Southwick became one of the main power brokers and decision makers in the Boston abolition movement and the Boston Female Anti-Slavery Society throughout the 1830s, 1840s, and 1850s. Thankful and her family were first introduced to the Boston Female Anti-Slavery Society in the winter of 1834 while still living in Peabody. Sarah and Joseph attended the First Anti-slavery Fair held by the Society. Thankful prompted her daughters to write articles for the fair in addition to attending it. After moving to Boston in 1835, Thankful and her daughters joined the Boston Female Anti-Slavery Society. The Southwick's two domestic servants—Phillis Salem, a black woman, and Eliza Garnaut, a Welsh immigrant—also joined the Society at this time. As part of the Boston Female Anti-Slavery Society, Thankful wrote and signed petitions, raised donations for the abolitionist cause, and helped coordinate the annual Anti-Slavery Fair (also known as the National Anti-Slavery Bazaar), which helped fund and support the Massachusetts Anti-Slavery Society. Thankful also attended state legislature sessions, court hearings, and political meetings with other members of the Boston Female Anti-Slavery Society, including the Chapmans and her daughters. During the early and mid 1800s, women did not attend political meetings due to the social norms, gender roles, and legal barriers that prevented women from participating in the political process. However, after Thankful and 12 other members of the Boston Female Anti-Slavery Society attended Wendell Phillips' speech at Faneuil Hall on December 8, 1837, Thankful and other female abolitionists attended political meetings in Boston freely. Due to the Southwick's affluent standing in Boston society, Thankful was able to devote large amounts of time and money to the cause, and Thankful and her daughter became prominent and powerful participants in the Boston abolition movement. During her first two years as a member of the Society, Thankful witnessed both the 1835 Boston Mob and the Abolition Riot of 1836.

=== 1835 Boston Mob ===
In October 1835, George Thompson was invited to speak at the Boston Female Anti-Slavery Society's meeting, which was to be held in the publishing office of The Liberator. Thankful and 49 other members of the Boston Female Anti-Slavery Society were gathered in William Lloyd Garrison's office when the meeting was broken up by a mob of 1,500 to 2,000 anti-abolitionist gentlemen who were looking for Thompson. While the crowd rioted in the streets and destroyed the office of The Liberator, Thankful and the other women continued to read scripture and discuss among themselves. When Mayor Theodore Lyman was finally able to convince the women of the Boston Female Anti-Slavery Society to leave, Thankful and the others were able to pass through the still-rioting streets unharmed.

During his initial stay in Boston and during future visits, Thompson stayed at the home of the Southwicks. Thankful would serve him dinner at 9 o'clock while Thompson would entertain the family with stories of his life in England.

=== Abolition Riot of 1836 ===
Thankful also participated in the Abolition Riot of 1836, which was known at the time as the Baltimore Slave Cases. In August 1836, Eliza Small and Polly Anne Bates were captured aboard the Chickasaw by the slave catcher Matthew Turner. Turner alleged that the two women were fugitive slaves belonging to John B. Morris of Baltimore. However, the two women had legal papers attesting to their freedom. Eliza and Polly Anne were detained aboard the ship by the captain while Turner applied for a warrant from their arrest. Word spread quickly, and a warrant was requested and issued against the captain of the Chickasaw. When Eliza and Polly Anne's case was argued, a delegation of Thankful and four other members of the Boston Female Anti-Slavery Society were present at the trial "to give... whatever comfort [their] presence might afford" to Eliza and Polly Anne. After Justice Shaw decided that the captain of the Chickasaw did not have the legal right to detain Eliza and Polly Anne and ruled for their release, a riot broke out in the courtroom when it appeared that Turner was about to immediately re-apprehend the women. Spectators rushed towards Eliza and Polly Ann and took them out of the courthouse. When the two women had been carried away, Thankful turned to Turner and said, "thy prey hath escaped thee," and then denounced his proclaimed support for the American Colonization Society.

=== Split in the Boston Female Anti-Slavery Society ===
In 1837, the Boston Female Anti-Slavery Society established a relationship with Sarah and Angelina Grimké. The Society promoted the Grimkés' 1837 lecture tour of Massachusetts and sponsored a series of lectures in Boston by the sisters. The Grimkés' public speeches were extremely controversial and laid the foundations for the eventual schism in the Boston Female Anti-Slavery Society. In response to the Grimkés' lectures, notable local ministers began to voice their opposition to women playing an active role in organized abolition. There was also an increasingly negative response by Bostonians to the public prominence and activism of the women in the Society, who became known as "petticoat politicians." In response, the Boston Female Anti-Slavery Society split into two blocks- the proclerical block, made up of middle-class Congregationalists and Baptists led by Mary Parker and Martha and Lucy Ball, and the anticlerical Garrisonian bloc, composed of upper-class Unitarians and Quakers led by Maria Weston Chapman, Thankful Southwick and her daughters, Lydia Maria Child, and Henrietta and Catherine Sargent.

The two blocks within the Boston Female Anti-Slavery Society were divided over the extent to which women should participate in the abolition movement and the nature of that participation. Thankful and the other Garrisonians believed that women should play a public role and that women should be accepted as equals with men within the movement. The Ball-Parker faction understood abolition as a part of female reform work necessitated and legitimized by the domestic and benevolent nature of women that needed to remain constrained by the boundaries of moral reform to prevent the intrusion of women into the public sphere.

Over the next few years, the two factions vied for control and power. During this time, Thankful and other radical Garrisonians petitioned and attend political meetings as private individuals rather than under the banner of the Boston Female Anti-Slavery Society. The proclerical faction held most of the elected positions and were able to refuse to call special meetings requested by the Garrisonians and allegedly miscounted votes to pass their own motions. In the winter of 1839 to 1840, Garrisonians were so convinced that the proclericals were miscounting votes that they would disrupt balloting by exclaiming, "I doubt the vote." The Garrisonians repeatedly contested the election of the officers for 1840, which prompted the April 1840 motion for the dissolution of the Boston Female Anti-Slavery Society. The motion passed, and the Society was dissolved.

A week after the vote to dissolve the Boston Female Anti-Slavery Society, the Chapman faction voted to restart the Society. Thankful would go on to serve as President of the new Boston Female Anti-Slavery Society in 1840, 1841, 1842, and 1844. The Anti-Slavery Fairs would become the main focus of the Boston Female Anti-Slavery Society until 1858. Thankful and other members would continue to petition, attend political meetings, and lecture as "women of the Massachusetts Anti-Slavery Society."

=== Underground Railroad ===
Thankful and Joseph Southwick's house was known for being a meeting place and caravansary for fellow abolitionists and other members of the anti-slavery movement. Elizabeth Cady Stanton remarked that Thankful's home "was always a harbor of rest for the weary, where the anti-slavery hosts were wont to congregate, and where one was always sure to meet someone worth knowing. Their hospitality was generous to an extreme, and so boundless that they were, at last, fairly eaten out of house and home." The Southwick home was also open to fugitive slaves, as it was an important station on the Underground Railroad route through Boston to Canada.

=== Non-resistance movement ===
In 1838, William Lloyd Garrison established the New England Non-Resistance Society. Previously, Garrison was a member of the American Peace Society. He established the New England Non-Resistance Society in opposition to the American Peace Society's approval of defensive warfare. The New England Non-Resistance Society also broke with the American Peace Society by allowing both men and women to become members and officials. Thankful Southwick joined the society with Anne W. Weston and Maria Weston Chapman of the Boston Female Anti-Slavery Society. Thankful was later elected to the executive committee.

== Involvement in the women's rights movement ==
Like other Garrisonian abolitionists, Thankful was also involved in the women's rights movement. In October 1850, Thankful and Sarah Southwick attended and signed the call of the National Women's Rights Convention held in Worcester, Massachusetts, the first national women's rights convention that called for "equality before the law without distinction of sex or color."

== Bibliography ==
- Caller, James Moore., Ober, Maria A. Genealogy of the Descendants of Lawrence and Cassandra Southwick of Salem, Mass: The Original Emigrants, and the Ancestors of the Families who Have Since Borne His Name. United States: J.H. Choate & Company, 1881.
- Curti, Merle E. "Non-Resistance in New England". The New England Quarterly 2, no. 1 (1929): 34–57.
- Garrison, William Lloyd. Edited by Louis Ruchames. The Letters of William Lloyd Garrison. United Kingdom: Belknap Press of Harvard University Press, 1979.
- Hasen, Deborah Gold. Strained Sisterhood Gender and Class in the Boston Female Anti-Slavery Society. Amherst, MA: Univ of Massachusetts Pr, 2009.
- Horne, James C. van, and Jean Fagan Yellin. The Abolitionist Sisterhood: Women's Political Culture in Antebellum America. Ithaca, NY: Cornell University Press, 1994.
- Jeffrey, Julie Roy. "The Liberty Women of Boston: Evangelicalism and Antislavery Politics". The New England Quarterly 85, no. 1 (March 2012): 38–70.
- Levy, Leonard W. "The 'Abolition Riot': Boston's First Slave Rescue". The New England Quarterly 25, no. 1 (March 1952): 85–92.
- Stanton, Elizabeth Cady. Eighty Years and More: Reminiscences, 1815–1897. Edited by Ellen Carol DuBois and Ann D. Gordon. New York, NY: Simon & Schuster Paperbacks, 2020.
- Southwick, Sarah H. Reminiscences of Early Anti-Slavery Days. Cambridge, MA: The Riverside Press, 1893.

== See also ==
- Boston Female Anti-Slavery Society
- New England Non-Resistance Society
- Abolitionist Movement
