= Commonwealth v. Aves =

1836 freedom suit in Massachusetts

- Court: Massachusetts Supreme Judicial Court
- Decided: 1836
- Cases cited: Somerset v Stewart

Case history
- Prior action: Decision in favor of plaintiffs.
- Subsequent action: Med Slater placed in the custody of a state-appointed guardian

Holding
- A citizen of any one of the United States where negro slavery is established by law, who comes into this State for any temporary purpose of business or pleasure, bringing a slave with him as a personal attendant, and stays some time, but does not acquire a domicil here, cannot restrain the slave of his liberty during his continuance here, and carry him out of this State against his consent.

Court membership
- Chief judge: Lemuel Shaw

Case opinions
- Decision by: Lemuel Shaw

Commonwealth v. Aves, 35 Mass. 193 (1836), was a case in the Massachusetts Supreme Judicial Court on the subject of transportation of slaves to free states. In August 1836, Chief Justice Lemuel Shaw ruled that slaves brought to Massachusetts "for any temporary purpose of business or pleasure" were entitled to freedom. The case was the most important legal victory for abolitionists in the 1830s and set a major precedent throughout the North.

== History ==
In 1836, Mary Aves Slater of New Orleans went to Boston to visit Thomas Aves, her father. She brought with her a six-year-old girl named Med who, under Louisiana law, was considered the property of Slater's husband, Samuel Slater. When members of the Boston Female Anti-Slavery Society learned that an enslaved girl was staying in Boston, they hired attorney Rufus Choate to bring the matter to court. Choate was joined by abolitionist attorneys Ellis Gray Loring and Samuel E. Sewall.

A writ of habeas corpus was served on Thomas Aves, the owner of the house where Med was staying. It was served in the name of a male abolitionist, Levin H. Harris, because it was considered unseemly in those days for women to take part in public affairs. On August 21, 1836, the case was brought before Chief Justice Lemuel Shaw of the Massachusetts Supreme Judicial Court.

Benjamin Robbins Curtis, later known for his dissent in the Dred Scott decision, represented Aves. Curtis argued that the doctrine of comity required Massachusetts to respect the laws of Louisiana, and therefore Mrs. Slater should be allowed to bring Med home with her.

Loring argued that the comity principle did not apply "in doubtful cases," and that there was no consensus on slavery; England and several other European nations had a policy of "disregarding the lex loci in the case of slaves," giving them "immediate and entire liberty" when they were brought there from another country. He characterized slavery as immoral, and expounded on the commonwealth's longstanding commitment to liberty.

When giving his opinion, Shaw discussed several precedents in international law, including the British case of Somerset v. Stewart (1772), and the abolishment of slavery in Massachusetts. The only people who could be treated as slaves in Massachusetts, he reasoned, were fugitive slaves, and then only because the U.S. Constitution specifically required it. Therefore, Med had become free as soon as her alleged owner voluntarily brought her to Massachusetts. He cited several cases demonstrating that even in Southern states it was understood that a slave became free when voluntarily brought to a free state.

Commonwealth v. Aves was later used as a precedent in other Northern states. Connecticut used it in Jackson v. Bulloch (1837); New York and Pennsylvania used it in legislation declaring that slaves became free when brought to those states; and Ohio courts began using it in 1841. By the start of the Civil War, every Northern state other than Indiana, Illinois, and New Jersey granted freedom automatically to any slave brought within its borders.

Med was placed in the custody of the abolitionist women, while her mother and siblings remained enslaved in New Orleans. The women renamed her Maria Somerset, after Maria Weston Chapman and the Somerset case. At some point later she was moved to an orphanage.

== See also ==
- Abolition Riot of 1836
