= The Liberty Bell (annual) =

American abolitionist publication

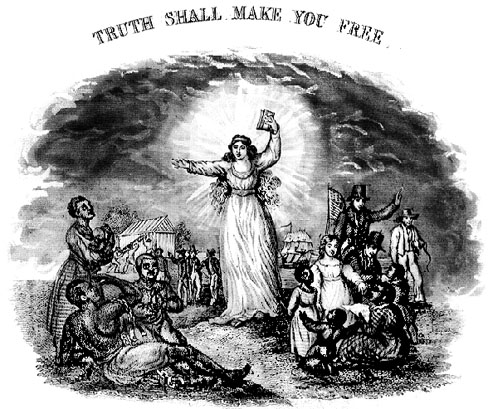
The Liberty Bell frontispiece from 1839

The Liberty Bell, by Friends of Freedom, was an annual abolitionist gift book, edited and published by Maria Weston Chapman, to be sold or gifted to participants in the National Anti-Slavery Bazaar organized by the Boston Female Anti-Slavery Society. Named after the symbol of the American Revolution, it was published nearly every year from 1839 to 1858.

== Background ==
In 1834 Maria Chapman of Boston, Massachusetts, her sisters Caroline, Anne, Deborah, and eight other women formed the Boston Female Anti-Slavery Society as part of their abolitionist activities. The Anti-Slavery Fair, first held in Boston in 1834, was a way to raise money for the society's work. Maria and her sister Anne were chief organizers of the fairs, which were popular Boston social events.

The fairs organizers raised thousands of dollars a year by selling things such as "ladies' aprons, cloaks, cuffs, bags, purses," "knitted quilts," "inkstands," "Ohio cheese," and "dolls in hundreds of every size, price, material, and costume." In 1839 these items were joined by The Liberty Bell, modeled after the fashionable and popular gift books of the time. The book was sold to fair attendees and given without cost to the fair workers, as an acknowledgement of contribution to the abolitionist cause and token of the occasion. Publication continued every year until 1846, and intermittently until 1859's edition, produced in 1858. (1840, 1850, 1855, and 1857 were missed) As with many gift books, publication actually occurred late in the year prior to the date of the book, except for the very first (1839) edition. The next edition was thus dated 1841.

== Content ==
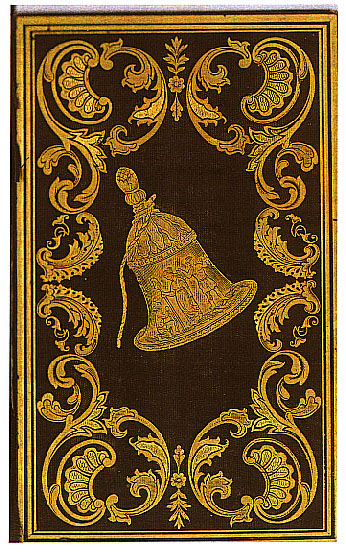
an ornate The Liberty Bell cover from 1848

As editor, Maria Chapman wrote much of the content (prose, essays, poetry) herself and pressed her sisters for material. She also solicited contributions from authors such as Lydia Maria Child, Eliza Cabot Follen, Wendell Phillips, Henry Wadsworth Longfellow, James Russell Lowell, Lucretia Mott William Lloyd Garrison and Harriet Martineau, among them many of the leading abolitionist, or abolitionist sympathizing writers of New England.

Chapman, in 1848, commented:

The purpose of this little annual volume, commenced in 1839, and now published for the ninth time, is, the promotion of the cause through the promulgation of its principles in an attractive form....Hence it is that no mere indifferent literati, however intellectually gifted, nor any known enemies of the cause or of its advocates, have ever been permitted to occupy these pages?

Her efforts at soliciting wider afield were successful as well, the Liberty Bell twice published works by Elizabeth Barrett Browning. The Runaway Slave at Pilgrim's Point was published in December 1847 for the 1848 edition, and A Curse for a Nation in December 1855 for the 1856 edition. Both of these works were later published in England as slightly different versions.

Unlike the more customary practice of writing for pay with more commercial gift books, authors typically did not receive any compensation for their submissions to the publication aside from a copy of The Liberty Bell itself.

== Critical review ==
Accounts differ as to the success and quality of the annual. Some derided the quality of the works, one scholar (Ralph Thompson) saying "throughout the fifteen volumes of the series there is hardly to be found one creation of aesthetic value" while others felt the work was adequate, another scholar (Clare Taylor) saying "a good magazine .... Its standards were high, and items were convincing, for the anti-slavery movement relied on propaganda to win support" Views of the effectiveness of the material as propaganda also vary, Thompson saying "like all unadulterated reform literature, the Liberty Bell circulated among those people who already knew and accepted the tenets it upheld... it could hardly have made many converts", while Taylor feels that "From the outset the Liberty Bell was the most significant anti-slavery annual in America" and that it "made a real contribution to the anti-slavery movement". But even Taylor disparages "sentimental tales of terror which filled every issue"(96), and the "silly sensationalism" of many of the pieces, concluding that "their methods were crude and simplistic, even if their intentions were good" Taylor rates the two contributions by Elizabeth Barrett Browning as the best.

== See also ==
- Boston Female Anti-Slavery Society
- Abolitionist publications
