= Benjamin Robbins Curtis =

US Supreme Court justice from 1851 to 1857

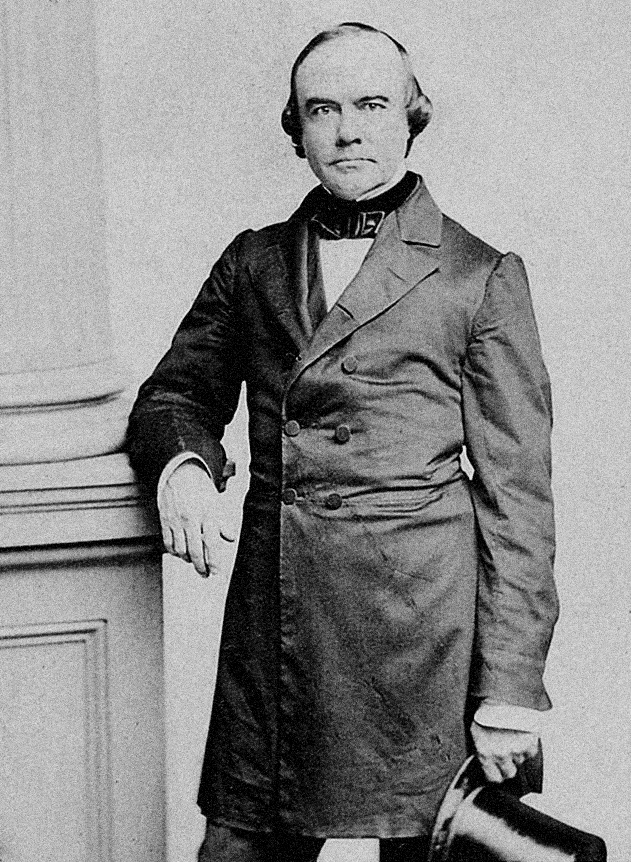

Associate Justice of the Supreme Court of the United States
- In office October 10, 1851 – September 30, 1857
- Nominated by: Millard Fillmore
- Preceded by: Levi Woodbury
- Succeeded by: Nathan Clifford

Personal details
- Born: November 4, 1809 Watertown, Massachusetts, U.S.
- Died: September 15, 1874 (aged 64) Newport, Rhode Island, U.S.
- Party: Whig (before 1854); Republican (1854–1862); Democratic (1863–1874)
- Spouses: Eliza Woodward (m. 1833; died 1844) Anna Scolley (m. 1846; died 1860) Maria Allen (m. 1861)
- Children: 12
- Education: Harvard University (BA, LLB)

Benjamin Robbins Curtis (November 4, 1809 – September 15, 1874) was an American lawyer and judge who served as an associate justice of the United States Supreme Court from 1851 to 1857. Curtis was the only Whig justice of the Supreme Court, and he was the first Supreme Court justice to have a formal law degree. He is often remembered as one of the two dissenters in the Supreme Court's infamous 1857 decision Dred Scott v. Sandford.

Curtis resigned from the Supreme Court in 1857 to return to private legal practice in Boston, Massachusetts. In 1868, Curtis was President Andrew Johnson's defense lawyer during Johnson's impeachment trial.

== Early life and education ==
Curtis was born November 4, 1809, in Watertown, Massachusetts, the son of Lois Robbins and Benjamin Curtis, the captain of a merchant vessel. Young Curtis attended common school in Newton and beginning in 1825 Harvard College, where he won an essay writing contest in his junior year. At Harvard, he became a member of the Porcellian Club. He graduated in 1829, and was a member of Phi Beta Kappa. He graduated from Harvard Law School in 1832.

== First private practice ==
Admitted to the Massachusetts bar later that year, Curtis began his legal career. In 1834, he moved to Boston and joined the law firm of Charles P. Curtis, where he developed expertise in admiralty law and also became known for his familiarity with patent law.

In 1836, Curtis participated in the Massachusetts "freedom suit" of Commonwealth v. Aves as one of the attorneys who unsuccessfully defended a slaveholding father. When New Orleans resident Mary Slater went to Boston to visit her father, Thomas Aves, she brought with her a young slave girl about six years of age, named Med. While Slater fell ill in Boston, she asked her father to take care of Med until she (Slater) recovered. The Boston Female Anti-Slavery Society and others sought a writ of habeas corpus against Aves, contending that Med became free by virtue of her mistress's having brought her voluntarily into Massachusetts. Aves responded to the writ, answering that Med was his daughter's slave, and that he was holding Med as his daughter's agent.

The Supreme Judicial Court of Massachusetts, through its Chief Justice, Lemuel Shaw, ruled that Med was free, and made her a ward of the court. The Massachusetts decision was considered revolutionary at the time. Previous decisions elsewhere had ruled that slaves voluntarily brought into a free state, and who resided there many years, became free. Commonwealth v. Aves was the first decision to hold that a slave voluntarily brought into a free state became free the moment he or she arrived. The decision in this freedom suit proved especially controversial in slaveholding southern states. As with his fellow Massachusettsan and Harvard graduate John Adams, Curtis's willingness to serve as defense attorney for the Aves family did not necessarily reflect his personal or legal views, as shown by his later dissent in the 1857 Dred Scott decision.

Curtis became a member of the Harvard Corporation, one of the two governing boards of Harvard University, in February 1846. In 1849, he was elected to the Massachusetts House of Representatives. Appointed chairman of a committee to reform state judicial procedures, they presented the Massachusetts Practice Act of 1851. "It was considered a model of judicial reform and was approved by the legislature without amendment."

At the time, Curtis was viewed as a rival to Rufus Choate and was thought to be the preeminent leader of the New England bar. Curtis came from a politically connected family, and had studied under Joseph Story and John Hooker Ashmun at Harvard Law School. His legal arguments were thought to be well-reasoned and persuasive. Curtis was a Whig and in tune with their politics, and Whigs were in power. As a potential young appointee, he was thought to be the seed of a long and productive judicial career. He was appointed by the president, approved by the Senate, elevated to the Supreme Court bench, but was gone in six years.

== Supreme Court service ==
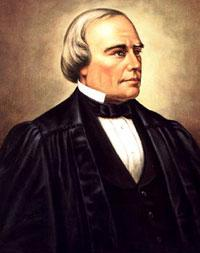
Portrait of Benjamin R. Curtis

Curtis received a recess appointment to the United States Supreme Court on September 22, 1851, by President Millard Fillmore, filling the vacancy caused by the death of Levi Woodbury. Massachusetts Senator Daniel Webster persuaded Fillmore to nominate Curtis to the Supreme Court, and was his primary sponsor. Formally nominated on December 11, 1851, Curtis was confirmed by the United States Senate on December 20, 1851, and received his commission the same day. Curtis was the earliest serving Supreme Court Justice to have been born in the 19th century. He was elected a Fellow of the American Academy of Arts and Sciences in 1854.

He was the first Supreme Court Justice to have earned a law degree from a law school. His predecessors had either "read law" (a form of apprenticeship in a practicing firm) or attended a law school without receiving a degree.

His opinion in Cooley v. Board of Wardens 53 U.S. 299 (1852) held that the Commerce Power as provided in the Commerce Clause, U.S. Const., Art. I, § 8, cl. 3, extends to laws related to pilotage. State laws related to commerce powers can be valid so long as Congress is silent on the matter. That resolved a historic controversy over federal interstate commerce powers. To this day, it is an important precedent in Commerce Clause cases. The issue was whether states can regulate aspects of commerce or whether that power is exclusive to Congress. Curtis concluded that the federal government has exclusive power to regulate commerce only when national uniformity is required. Otherwise, states may regulate commerce.

Curtis was one of the two dissenters in the Dred Scott case, in which he disagreed with essentially every holding of the court. He argued against the majority's denial of the bid for emancipation by the slave Dred Scott. Curtis stated that, because there were black citizens in both Southern and Northern states at the time of the drafting of the federal Constitution, black people thus were clearly among the "people of the United States" contemplated thereunder. Curtis also opined that because the majority had found that Scott lacked standing, the Court could not go further and rule on the merits of Scott's case.

Curtis resigned from the court on September 30, 1857, in part because he was exasperated with the fraught atmosphere in the court engendered by the case. As one source puts it, "a bitter disagreement and coercion by Roger Taney prompted Benjamin Curtis's departure from the Court in 1857." However, others view the cause of his resignation as having been both temperamental and financial. He did not like "riding the circuit," as Supreme Court Justices were then required to do. He was temperamentally estranged from the court and was not inclined to work with others. The acrimony over the Dred Scott decision had blossomed into mutual distrust. He did not want to live on $6,500 per year, much less than his earnings in private practice.

== Return to private practice ==
Upon his resignation, Curtis returned to his Boston law practice, becoming a "leading lawyer" in the nation. During the ensuing decade and a half, he argued several cases before the Supreme Court. Although Curtis initially supported Abraham Lincoln as president, by 1863 he was criticizing Lincoln's "utter incompetence" and publicly argued that the Emancipation Proclamation was unconstitutional. This put Curtis out of the running when Lincoln had to choose a successor to Chief Justice Roger Taney, who died in October 1864. In the presidential campaign of that year, Curtis supported Democrat George B. McClellan against Lincoln.

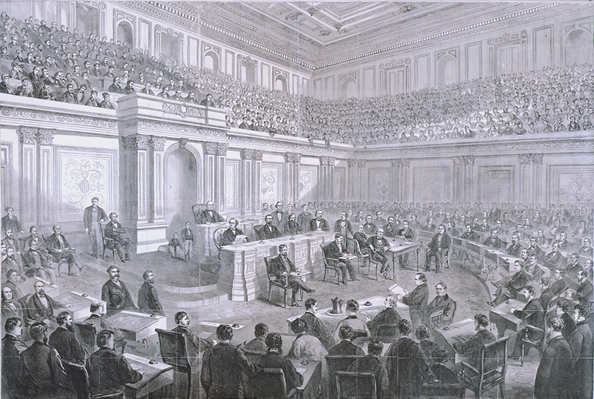
Illustration of Senate chamber as Curtis, acting as counsel to President Andrew Johnson, talks on March 23, 1868, during the impeachment trial of Johnson

In 1868, Curtis acted as defense counsel for President Andrew Johnson during Johnson's impeachment trial. He read the answer to the articles of impeachment, which was "largely his work". His opening statement lasted two days, and was commended for legal prescience and clarity. He successfully persuaded the Senate that an impeachment was a judicial act, not a political act, so that it required a full hearing of evidence. This precedent "influenced every subsequent impeachment".

After the impeachment trial, Curtis declined President Andrew Johnson's offer of the position of U.S. Attorney General. A highly recommended candidate for the Chief Justice position upon the death of Salmon P. Chase in 1873, Curtis was passed over by President Ulysses S. Grant. He was the unsuccessful Democratic candidate for U.S. senator from Massachusetts in 1874. From his judicial retirement in 1857 to his death in 1874, his aggregate professional income was about $650,000.

== Personal life ==
Curtis had 12 children and was married three times.

== Death and legacy ==
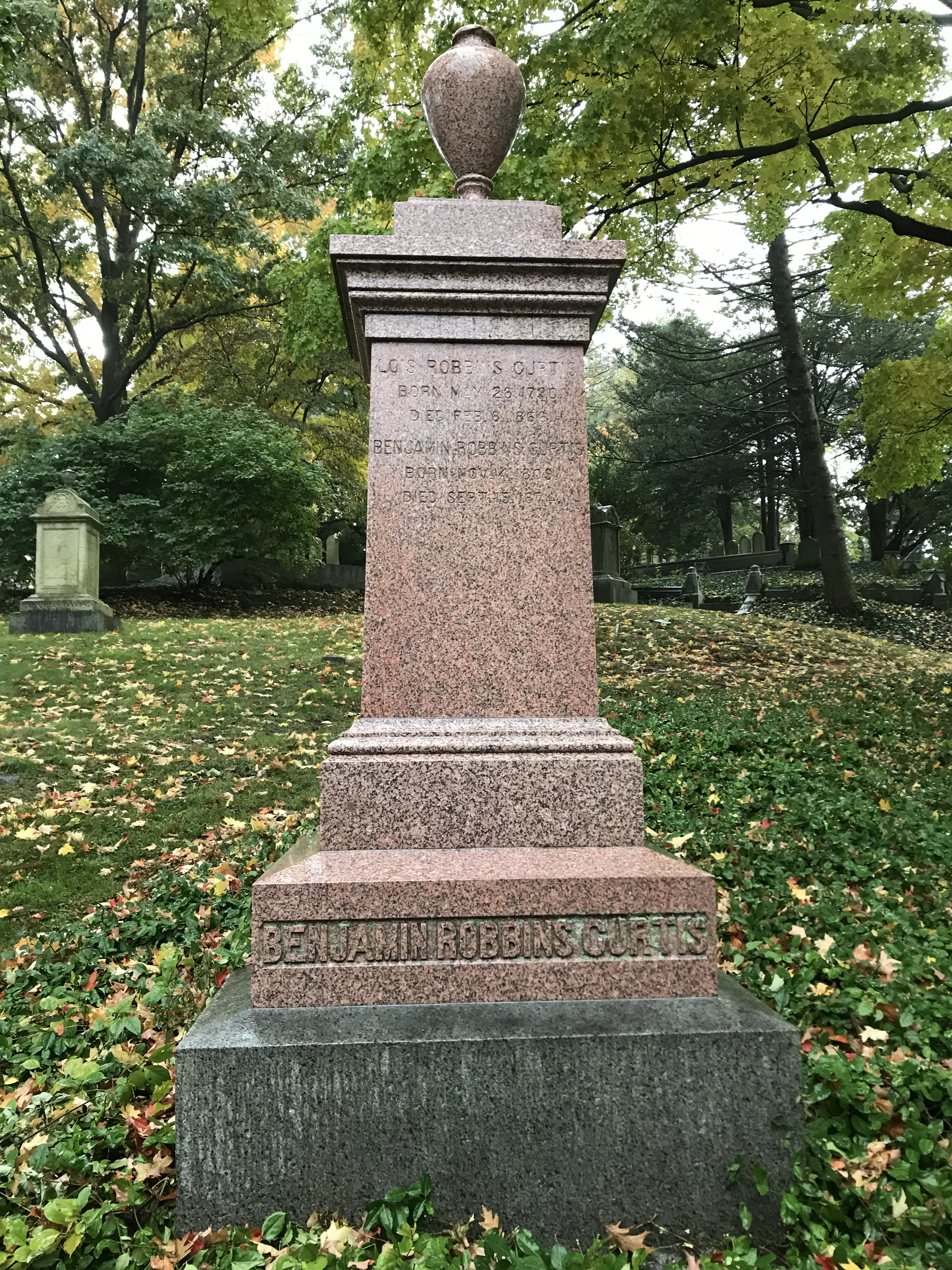
Curtis's gravesite

Curtis died in Newport, Rhode Island, on September 15, 1874. He is buried at Mount Auburn Cemetery, 580 Mount Auburn Street, Cambridge, Massachusetts. On October 23, 1874, Attorney General George Henry Williams presented in the Supreme Court the resolutions submitted by the bar on Curtis's death and shared observations on Judge Curtis's defense of President Andrew Johnson in the articles of impeachment against him.

Curtis's daughter, Annie Wroe Scollay Curtis, married (on December 9, 1880) future Columbia University President and New York Mayor Seth Low. They had no children.

== Published works ==
- Reports of Cases in the Circuit Courts of the United States (2 vols., Boston, 1854)
- Judge Curtis's Edition of the Decisions of the Supreme Court of the United States, with notes and a digest (22 vols., Boston: Little Brown & Company, 1855).
- Digest of the Decisions of the Supreme Court of the United States from the origin of the court to 1854 Little Brown & Co., (1864).
- Memoir and Writings (2 vols., Boston, 1880), the first volume including a memoir by Curtis's brother, George Ticknor Curtis, and the second "Miscellaneous Writings," edited by the former Justice's son, Benjamin R. Curtis Jr.

== See also ==
- Demographics of the Supreme Court of the United States
- Dual federalism
- List of justices of the Supreme Court of the United States
- List of United States Supreme Court justices by time in office
- Origins of the American Civil War
- United States Supreme Court cases during the Taney Court

Legal offices
Preceded by Levi Woodbury	Associate Justice of the Supreme Court of the United States; 1851–1857	Succeeded by Nathan Clifford
