= Milton Cemetery =

Historic cemetery in Massachusetts, United States

- U.S. National Register of Historic Places
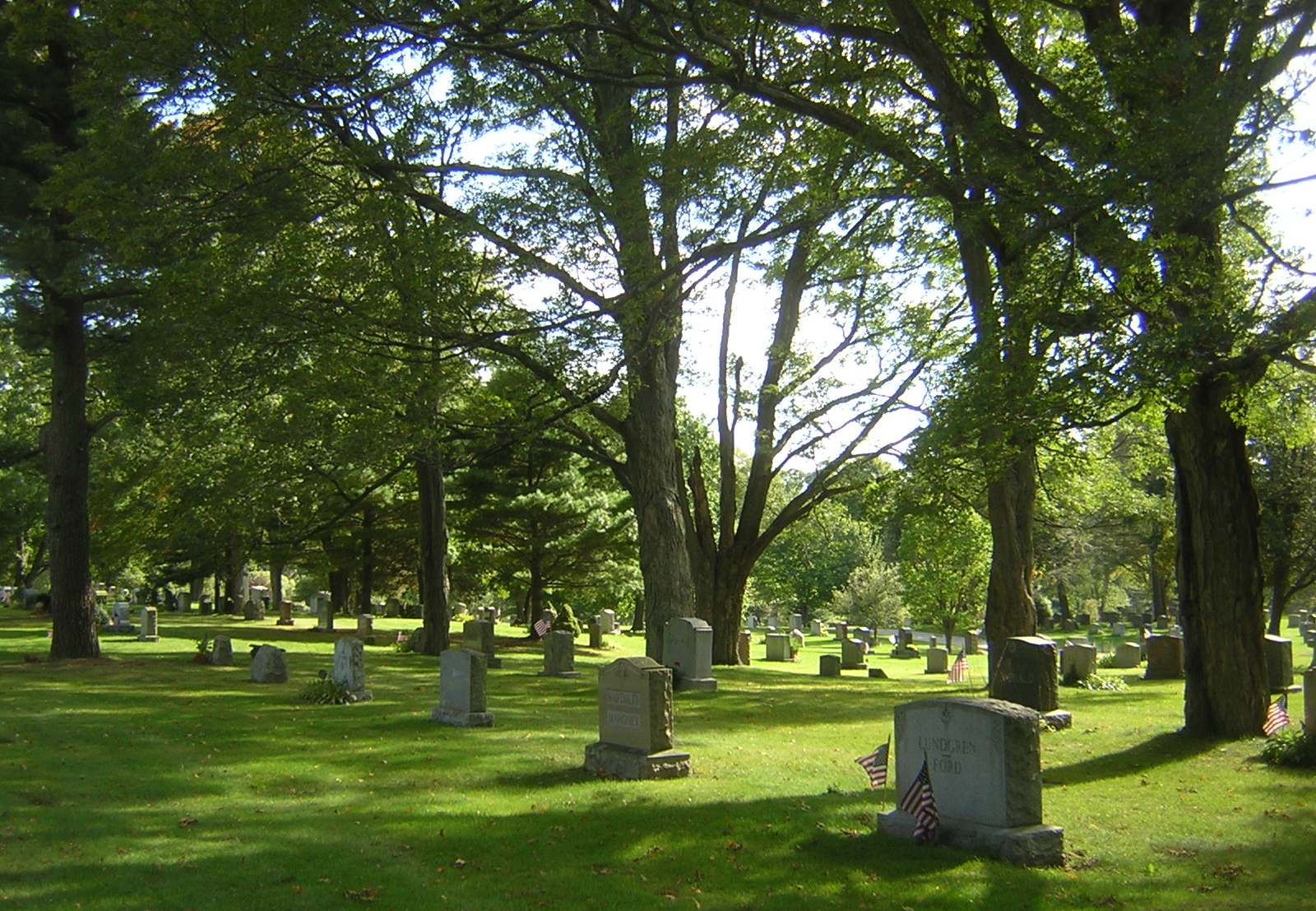

- Location within Massachusetts Location within the United States
- Location: 211 Centre St., Milton, Massachusetts
- Coordinates: 42°15′42″N 71°3′39″W
- Area: 102 acres (41 ha)
- Built: 1672
- Architect: Mumford, William; et al.
- Architectural style: Queen Anne, Gothic Revival
- NRHP reference No.: 04000537
- Added to NRHP: June 02, 2004

Milton Cemetery is a historic cemetery at 211 Centre Street in Milton, Massachusetts. Established in 1672, it is the town's only municipal burying ground. There are three distinct sections to its 102-acre (41 ha) grounds: the original burying ground, a tract of 3 acres (1.2 ha) which was in use between 1672 and 1854, a "new" section, laid out in 1854 in the rural cemetery style which was fashionable in the 19th century, and a "modern" section, established in 1945.

It was founded in 1672 and added to the National Register of Historic Places in 2004. Among those interred in the cemetery are:

- Dennis Miller Bunker, American Impressionist Painter
- James A. Burke, United States Representative from Massachusetts
- Elbie Fletcher, Major League Baseball player
- Edward A. Gisburne, United States Navy sailor and Medal of Honor recipient
- Nathaniel Carl Goodwin, actor and vaudevillian
- Howard Deering Johnson, businessman and founder of the Howard Johnson's restaurant and hotel chain
- Ann Terry Greene Phillips, abolitionist and wife of Wendell Phillips
- Wendell Phillips, abolitionist, advocate for Native Americans, and orator
- Steve Trapilo, player in the National Football League
- Paul H. Weinert, United States Army soldier and Medal of Honor recipient

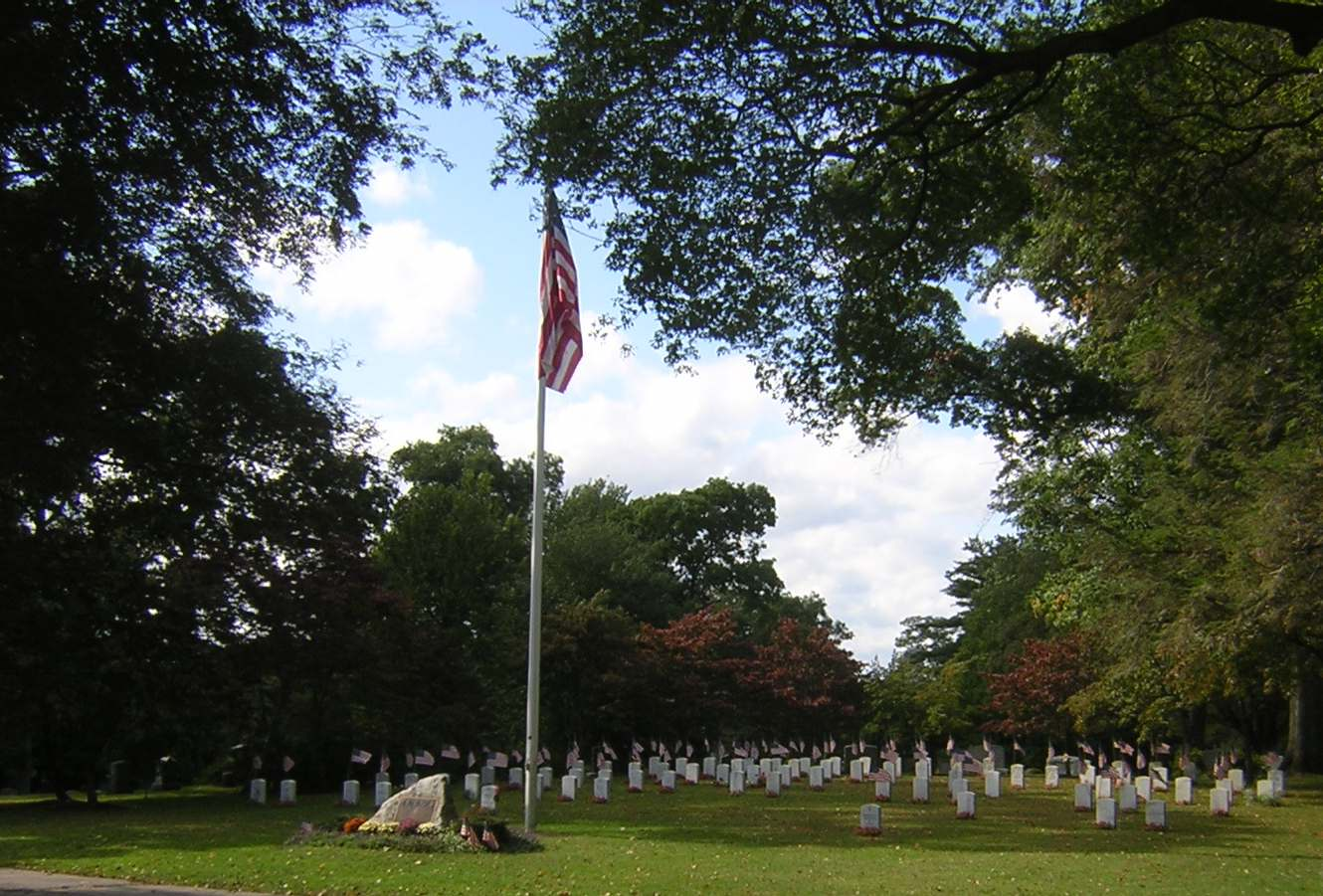

== See also ==
- National Register of Historic Places listings in Milton, Massachusetts
