= Ann Terry Greene Phillips =

American abolitionist (1813–1886)

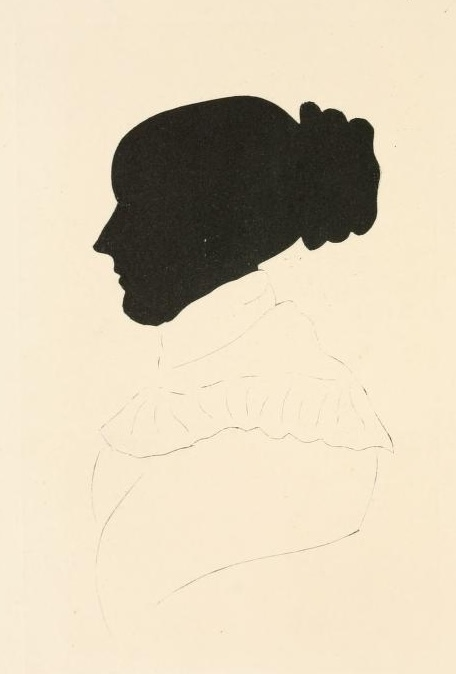
- Born: Ann Terry Greene; November 19, 1813; Boston, Massachusetts, US
- Died: April 24, 1886 (aged 72); Boston, Massachusetts
- Burial place: Milton Cemetery
- Occupations: abolitionist, activist
- Spouse: Wendell Phillips (m. 1836)

Ann Terry Greene Phillips (November 19, 1813 – April 24, 1886) was an American abolitionist from Boston. She shaped the beliefs of her husband, Wendell Phillips.

== Biography ==
Phillips was born Ann Terry Greene in Boston, Massachusetts, on November 19, 1813, a daughter of Benjamin Greene and Mary Grew. Orphaned as a child, she was raised by her aunt and uncle, a shipping merchant named Henry Chapman. The Chapman family were staunch abolitionists and supporters of William Lloyd Garrison, and from youth Ann was an active member of the Boston Female Anti-Slavery Society.

In 1835, Ann took a stage-coach trip to Greenfield, Massachusetts (future US senator Charles Sumner withdrew from the journey at the last moment). On the coach, she met Wendell Phillips, a wealthy lawyer and Boston Brahmin. They became engaged in 1836 and married in October 1837. Wendell's support for the abolition of slavery developed into radical activism under the influence of his wife; indeed, he often confided to friends, "My wife made an out and out abolitionist of me, and she always preceded me in the adoption of the various causes I have advocated." The marriage was a love match ("my better three quarters," she called him), and the couple rarely parted for more than two or three days a time, despite Wendell's frequent travels to deliver speeches in support of abolition, women's rights, Native American rights, and other causes. Wendell implicitly trusted Ann's counsel and judgment and by all accounts thoroughly doted on her. The couple traveled to Europe in June 1839 and spent the ensuing two years touring Britain, France, Italy, and Germany. They served as delegates from the Massachusetts Anti-Slavery Society to the World's Anti-Slavery Convention in London in 1840.

Ann was an invalid from youth, confined to her room and often to her bed for much of her life. She experienced chronic weakness and pain from an illness that no source specified, though contemporaries remarked on her abiding humor and acumen. After her return to America she lived a largely secluded existence at home. However, she kept up a correspondence with Elizabeth Pease Nichol, Lydia Maria Child, and Louisa Gilman Loring. The couple had no biological children but adopted an orphan, Phoebe Garnaut, in 1850.

Ann Phillips died at the age of 72 on April 24, 1886, at her home in Boston. Lucy Stone and Julia Ward Howe spoke at her funeral. She was buried alongside her husband, who had predeceased her by two years, at Milton Cemetery in Milton, Massachusetts.
