= Edward A. Gisburne =

Edward Allen Gisburne
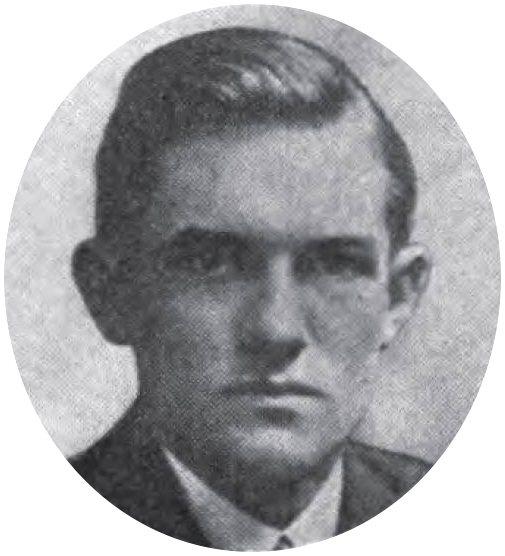
- Edward A. Gisburne
- Born: June 14, 1892; Providence, Rhode Island
- Died: August 29, 1955 (aged 63); Chelsea, Massachusetts
- Burial place: Milton Cemetery, Milton, Massachusetts
- Military career
- Allegiance: United States of America
- Branch: United States Navy
- Service years: 1910–1914, 1917–1920, 1942–1945
- Rank: Lieutenant
- Nickname: Eddie
- Units: USS Florida (BB-30); USS George Washington (ID-3018)
- Conflicts: United States occupation of Veracruz; World War I World War II
- Awards: Medal of Honor

Edward Allen "Eddie" Gisburne (June 14, 1892 – August 29, 1955) was a United States Navy officer and a recipient of the U.S. military's highest decoration, the Medal of Honor, for his role in the battle which began the U.S. occupation of Veracruz, Mexico. He earned the medal as an enlisted man for ignoring heavy fire and his own severe injuries to drag a wounded marine to safety. Although he lost his left leg in the fight, he went on to complete two more terms of service with the Navy, one as a radio operator during World War I and another as a 50-year-old commissioned officer in World War II.

== Early life and career ==
Born on June 14, 1892, in Providence, Rhode Island, Gisburne attended school in Quincy, Massachusetts. He came from a family with a tradition of naval service, with six generations having served in the Navy since the American Civil War. An only child, Gisburne's father died when he was 5, and his mother died months later. He eventually moved in with his paternal grandparents in Washington, D.C., where he lived for the next ten years. In 1910, he graduated from Washington's McKinley Manual Training School. He held a childhood interest in electricity and later wireless telegraphy which led to a career in radio technology.

After his graduation, Gisburne worked for an electrical company in Boston for a few months before finding work at the Boston Navy Yard. While there, he and a group of friends decided on a whim to join the Navy; Gisburne enlisted for a four-year term of service on August 30, 1910. He was first stationed as a signaler on the battleship USS Wyoming (BB-32) and then on the supply ship USS Culgoa (AF-3).

== Veracruz and World War I ==
In early 1914, Gisburne, by then an electrician third class, was transferred to the USS Florida (BB-30) and became the battleship's chief radio operator. On April 21, 1914, in the midst of the ongoing Mexican Revolution, Florida was one of three U.S. Navy ships which landed a combined Navy and Marine Corps force at Veracruz, Mexico, in response to the Tampico Affair. The landings began a three-day battle which ended with U.S. occupation of the city.

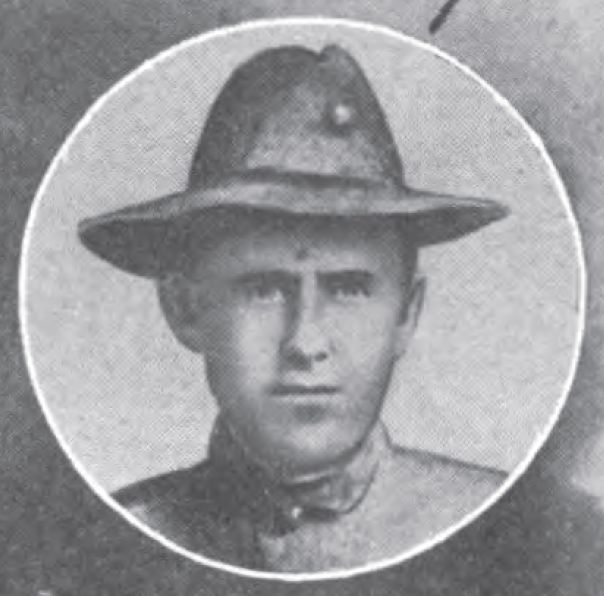
Private Daniel A. Haggerty

Accompanying Florida's landing party, Gisburne and others made their way to the roof of Veracruz's Terminal Hotel in order to establish a communications station. When the position came under fire, a Marine Corps rifle squad was sent to provide protection. The first marine to reach the roof, Private Daniel A. Haggerty of Cambridge, Massachusetts, was almost immediately shot in the stomach and fell such that he was partially hanging off the roof. Gisburne himself was severely wounded in the legs, leaving him unable to walk. Despite this, he crawled through the continuous heavy fire to reach the unconscious Haggerty, pulled him fully onto the roof, and then dragged him to a place of shelter before falling unconscious himself. The two were found still sitting on the roof, with Haggerty dead in Gisburne's arms. Gisburne eventually recovered from his injuries, but his left leg had to be amputated at mid-thigh. He was awarded the Medal of Honor for his actions at Veracruz two months after the battle, on June 15, and was discharged from the Navy after a further two months, on August 17.

Gisburne's official Medal of Honor citation reads:

On board the U.S.S. Florida during the seizure of Vera Cruz, Mexico, 21 and 22 April 1914, and for extraordinary heroism in the line of his profession during this action.

On April 5, 1917, exactly one day before the U.S. entered World War I by declaring war on Germany, Gisburne rejoined the Navy at the warrant officer rank of gunner (radio). Due to his missing leg, he had to get a waiver from the Secretary of the Navy, Josephus Daniels, before he could rejoin. He was promoted to the commissioned officer rank of ensign on January 12, 1918, and to lieutenant (junior grade) on December 5 of that year (retroactive to November 20). A radio operator, Gisburne handled communications for all cruisers and transports operating in the Atlantic Ocean during the war. He was serving on the transport USS George Washington (ID-3018) when it carried President Woodrow Wilson to Europe for the Paris Peace Conference in 1919. Gisburne was given a medical retirement on August 9, 1920, two years after the end of the war.

== Civilian life ==
After his first enlistment in the Navy, Gisburne settled in Milton, Massachusetts, where he would live for 35 years. He married Ena Frye of Boston and the couple had two sons, Edward Jr. and John. He held a number of jobs, including as a teacher of classes about radio at Boston College, a reporter for The Patriot Ledger in Quincy, and a district manager for the Boston Edison Company. He began a broadcasting career with Boston radio station WEEI in late 1927. He started as an editor and, from 1928 through the 1930s, was an announcer. Gisburne was an avid golfer with the Wollaston Golf Club and participated in the Engineers Club of Boston. He was also active in civic affairs, becoming a member of the Milton Town Club and twice being elected to the Milton School Committee, in 1935 and 1938.

== World War II and later years ==
Despite being both an amputee and 50 years old, Gisburne began a third stint in the Navy after the 1941 attack on Pearl Harbor. He served as a lieutenant at Naval Air Station Quonset Point in Rhode Island. Both of his sons also served in the war. The older son, Edward Jr., fought in the Pacific theater with the 40th Bombardment Group and earned the Air Medal for his actions in aerial combat with the Japanese; he was killed in action at age 29 on May 26, 1945, when his B-29 Superfortress went down.

Gisburne and his wife moved to Duxbury, Massachusetts, in 1950. He died at age 63 on August 29, 1955, at Chelsea Naval Hospital in Chelsea, Massachusetts. He was interred in a family plot at Milton Cemetery which also includes the grave of his wife Ena and a memorial marker for his son Edward Jr. He is one of two Medal of Honor recipients buried in the cemetery, the other being Indian Wars soldier Paul H. Weinert.

== See also ==
- List of Medal of Honor recipients (Veracruz)
