= Paul H. Weinert =

United States Army Medal of Honor recipient

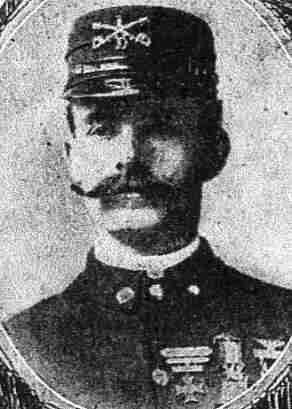
- Paul H. Weinert as appearing in O.F. Keydel's Deeds of Valor: How America's Heroes Won the Medal of Honor (1907)
- Born: May 28, 1869; Frankfurt, Germany
- Died: January 19, 1919 (aged 49); Milton, Massachusetts, United States
- Burial place: Milton Cemetery
- Military career
- Allegiance: United States
- Branch: United States Army
- Service years: 1886 - 1895, 1898 - 1899
- Rank: Sergeant
- Unit: 1st U.S. Artillery
- Conflicts: Ghost Dance War: Wounded Knee Massacre
- Awards: Medal of Honor

Sergeant Paul H. Weinert (July 15, 1869 – January 19, 1919) was an American soldier in the U.S. Army who served with the 1st U.S. Artillery during the Indian Wars. He was one of twenty men who received the Medal of Honor for gallantry at what was then called the Battle of Wounded Knee, but now commonly called the Wounded Knee Massacre, taking charge of the battery when his commanding officer was severely wounded, on December 29, 1890.

== Biography ==
Paul H. Weinert was born in Frankfurt, Germany on July 15, 1869. He later emigrated to the United States and joined the United States Army from Baltimore, Maryland in November 1886 (claiming to be 21 because he was underage). He was assigned to Battery E of the 1st U.S. Artillery and became a Corporal by age 20.

Weinert was present at the Wounded Knee Massacre when, on the morning of December 29, 1890, members of the 7th U.S. Cavalry Regiment surrounded the camp of the Sioux chieftain Big Foot in order to apprehend weapons from his band. His unit, consisting of four Hotchkiss guns, moved in after the fighting started and began giving artillery support to the cavalry troops. When his commanding officer, Lieutenant Harry Hawthorne, was severely wounded he assumed command and, with another soldier, directed artillery fire and successfully cleared out a key position, a ravine "pocket", supposedly occupied by a number of the Sioux warriors. He and the second cannoneer remained under heavy fire during the battle, at one point causing a round to be knocked out of Weinert's hands as he was about to load, resulting in the gun carriage being riddled with bullets. The two continued manually moving the cannon with each discharge to move it into a better position until the end of the battle. For his actions, he received the Medal of Honor along with four other artillerymen. He was discharged in 1895, and served again from 1898 until 1899.

More recent reports have shown that unarmed civilians were hiding in the ravine, and that "Weiner's firing inflicted terrible damage, undoubtedly killing and wounding many women and children."

Weinert died in Milton, Massachusetts on January 19, 1919, at the age of 49. He is one of two MOH recipients, along with Edward A. Gisburne, interred at Milton Cemetery.

== Medal of Honor citation ==
Rank and organization: Corporal, Company E, 1st U.S. Artillery. Place and date: At Wounded Knee Creek, S. Dak., 29 December 1890. Entered service at: Baltimore, Md. Birth: Germany. Date of issue: 24 March 1891.

Citation:

Taking the place of his commanding officer who had fallen severely wounded, he gallantly served his piece, after each fire advancing it to a better position.

=== Controversy ===
Mass Grave for the Dead Lakota After the Engagement at Wounded Knee

There have been several attempts by various parties to rescind the Medals of Honor awarded in connection with the Wounded Knee Massacre. Proponents claim that the engagement was in-fact a massacre and not a battle, due to the high number of killed and wounded Lakota women and children and the very one-sided casualty counts. Estimates of the Lakota losses indicate 150–300 killed, of which up to 200 were women and children. Additionally, as many as 51 were wounded. In contrast, the 7th Cavalry suffered 25 killed and 39 wounded, many being the result of friendly fire.

Calvin Spotted Elk, direct descendant of Chief Spotted Elk killed at Wounded Knee, launched a petition to rescind medals from the soldiers who participated in the battle.

The Army has also been criticized more generally for the seemingly disproportionate number of Medals of Honor awarded in connection with the battle. For comparison, 19 Medals were awarded at Wounded Knee, 21 at the Battle of Cedar Creek, and 20 at the Battle of Antietam. Respectively, Cedar Creek and Antietam involved 52,712 and 113,000 troops, suffering 8,674 and 22,717 casualties. Wounded Knee, however, involved 610 combatants and resulted in as many as 705 casualties (including non-combatants).

== See also ==
- List of Medal of Honor recipients for the Indian Wars
