= Elbie Fletcher =

American baseball player (1916–1994)

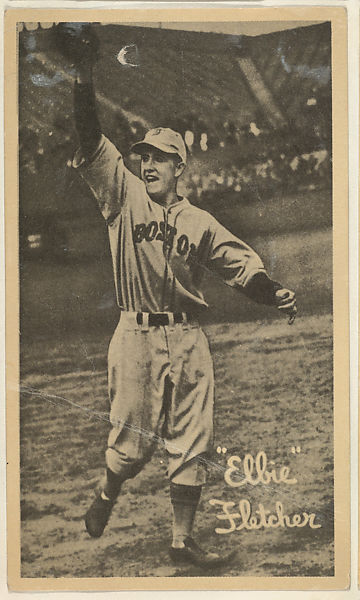
- First baseman
- Born: March 18, 1916; Milton, Massachusetts, U.S.
- Died: March 9, 1994 (aged 77); Milton, Massachusetts, U.S.
- Batted: Left Threw: Left

MLB debut
- September 16, 1934, for the Boston Braves

Last MLB appearance
- October 2, 1949, for the Boston Braves

MLB statistics
- Batting average: .271
- Home runs: 79
- Runs batted in: 616
- Stats at Baseball Reference

Teams
- Boston Braves / Bees (1934–1935, 1937–1939); Pittsburgh Pirates (1939–1943, 1946–1947); Boston Braves (1949)

Career highlights and awards
- All-Star (1943)

Elburt Preston Fletcher (March 18, 1916 – March 9, 1994) was an American professional baseball first baseman. He played all or part of 12 seasons in Major League Baseball for the Boston Braves (1934–35) and Bees (1937–39), Pittsburgh Pirates (1939–43, 1946–47) and Braves again (1949). Fletcher batted and threw left-handed.

Fletcher made his major league debut in 1934 in an unusual way. A contest was held to determine which Boston-area high school player was most likely to reach the major leagues, with the winner receiving an invitation to the Braves' spring training camp. With the help of a number of votes from his large family, Fletcher won, and then actually made the team.

Fletcher led the National League in bases on balls in 1940 and '41 with 119 and 118 respectively and in on-base percentage in 1940, '41 and '42 with .418, .421 and .417 marks respectively.

During a 12-season career, Fletcher posted a .271 batting average with 79 home runs and 616 RBI in 1415 games played. Defensively, he recorded a .993 fielding percentage playing every inning of his major league career at first base.

Fletcher died in Milton, Massachusetts, nine days before his 78th birthday, and was buried in Milton Cemetery.
