= Wendell Phillips =

American abolitionist and advocate (1811–1884)

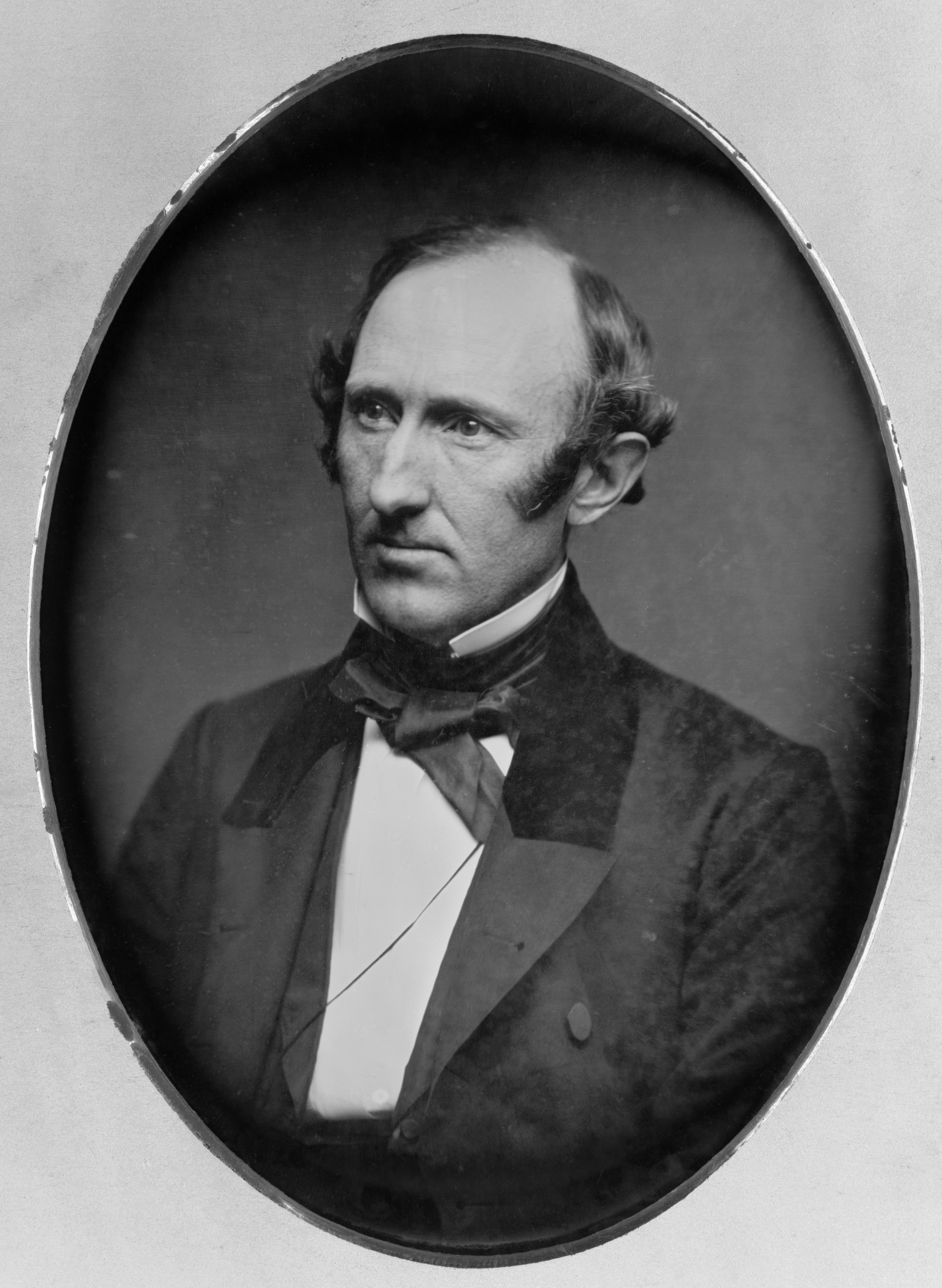
- A daguerreotype by Mathew Brady of Wendell Phillips in his forties
- Born: November 29, 1811; Boston, Massachusetts, U.S.
- Died: February 2, 1884 (aged 72); Boston, Massachusetts, U.S.
- Burial place: Milton Cemetery
- Education: Harvard University (AB, LLB)
- Occupation: Attorney
- Known for: Abolitionism, advocacy for Native Americans
- Spouse: Ann Terry Greene Phillips
- Parent(s): Sarah Walley; John Phillips

Wendell Phillips (November 29, 1811 – February 2, 1884) was an American abolitionist, labor reformer, temperance activist, advocate for Native Americans, orator, and attorney.

According to George Lewis Ruffin, a black attorney, Phillips was seen by many black people as "the one White American wholly color-blind and free from race prejudice". Another black attorney, Archibald Grimké, saw him as ahead of William Lloyd Garrison and Charles Sumner as an abolitionist leader. From 1850 to 1865 he was the "preeminent figure" in American abolitionism.

== Early life and education ==
Phillips was born in Boston, Massachusetts, on November 29, 1811, to Sarah Walley and John Phillips, a wealthy lawyer, politician, and philanthropist, who was the first mayor of Boston. He was a descendant of Reverend George Phillips, who emigrated from England to Watertown, Massachusetts, in 1630. All his ancestors migrated to North America from England, and all of them arrived in Massachusetts between 1630 and 1650.

Phillips was schooled at Boston Latin School and graduated from Harvard College in 1831. He went on to attend Harvard Law School, from which he graduated in 1833. In 1834, Phillips was admitted to the Massachusetts state bar, and in 1835, he opened a law practice in Boston.

== Marriage to Ann Terry Greene ==
In 1836, Phillips was supporting the abolitionist cause when he met Ann Terry Greene. She believed that this movement required not just support but total commitment. Phillips later acknowledged Ann's influence: “My wife made me an out and out abolitionist and she always preceded me in the adoption of the various causes I have advocated.” Phillips and Greene were engaged that year, and Greene declared Wendell to be her "best three quarters". They were married until Wendell's death, 46 years later.

Phillips's marriage and his embrace of abolitionism led to his exile from Boston's elite society and cost him his legal practice. Believing that their son had gone mad, Phillips's family considered having him placed in a sanatorium.

== Abolitionism ==
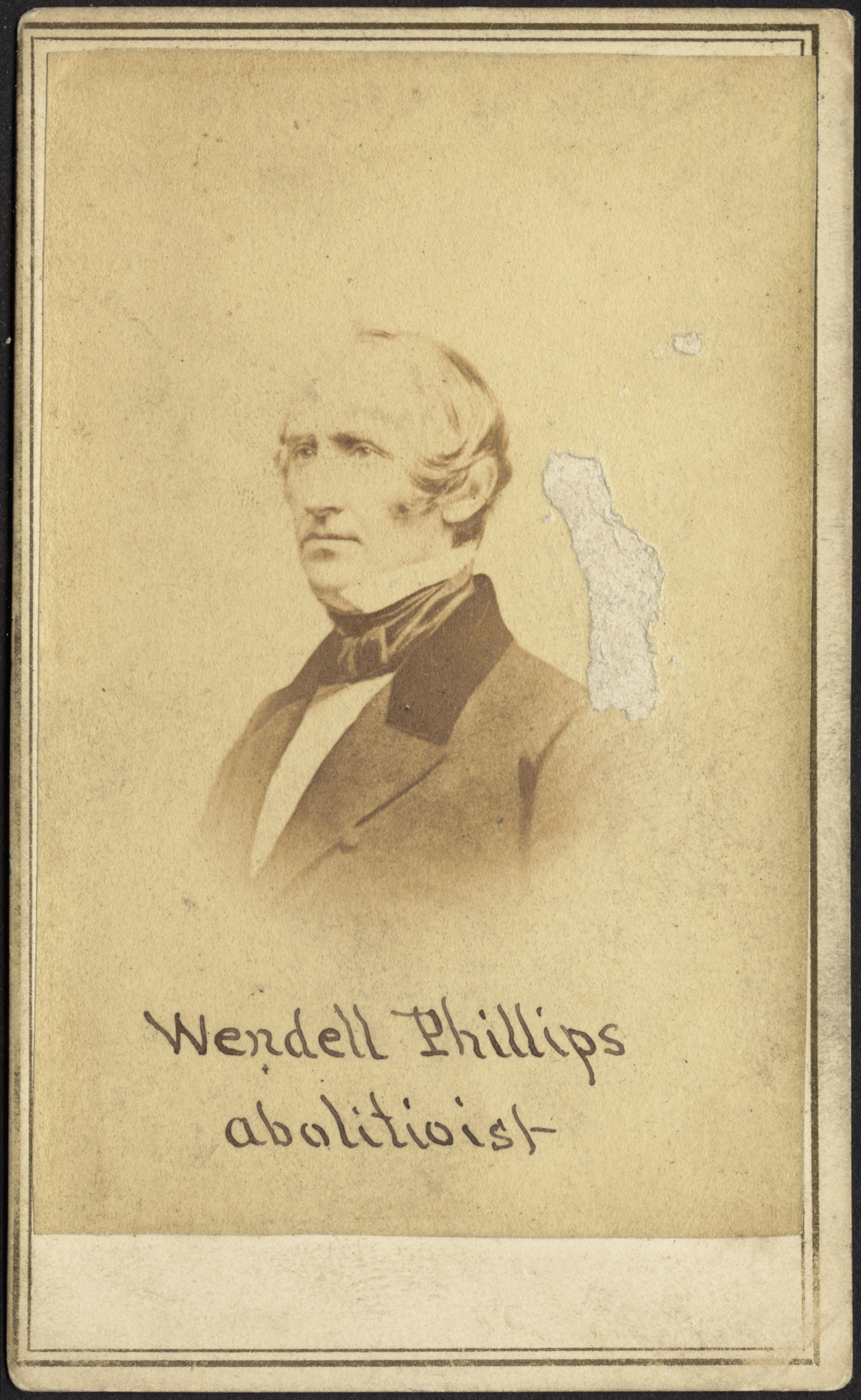
Wendell Phillips, abolitionist, [ca. 1859–1870]. Carte de Visite Collection, Boston Public Library.

On October 21, 1835, the Boston Female Anti-Slavery Society announced that British abolitionist George Thompson would be speaking. Pro-slavery forces posted nearly 500 notices of a $100 reward for the citizen that would first lay violent hands on him. Thompson canceled at the last minute, and William Lloyd Garrison, editor and publisher of the abolitionist newspaper The Liberator, was quickly scheduled to speak in his place. A lynch mob formed, forcing Garrison to escape through the back of the hall and hide in a carpenter's shop. The mob soon found him, putting a noose around his neck to drag him away. Several strong men, including the mayor, intervened and took him to the most secure place in Boston, the Leverett Street Jail. Phillips, watching from nearby Court Street, was a witness to the attempted lynching.

After being converted to the abolitionist cause by Garrison in 1836, Phillips stopped practicing law in order to dedicate himself to the movement. Phillips joined the American Anti-Slavery Society and frequently made speeches at its meetings. So highly regarded were Phillips' oratorical abilities that he was known as "abolition's golden trumpet".

Phillips lectured widely throughout his lifetime and for which he was paid handsomely. From his speaking engagements, he earned $10,000 to $15,000 annually; for those programs concerning abolitionist themes, he charged no fee. Phillips's cash donations to needy individuals and families was extensive. Of his estimated $150,000 income earned over 45 years, his itemized personal gifts amounted to over $65,000.

Like many of Phillips' fellow abolitionists who honored the free-produce movement, he condemned the purchase of cane sugar and clothing made of cotton, since both were produced by the labor of slaves. He was a member of the Boston Vigilance Committee, which assisted fugitive slaves in avoiding slavecatchers.

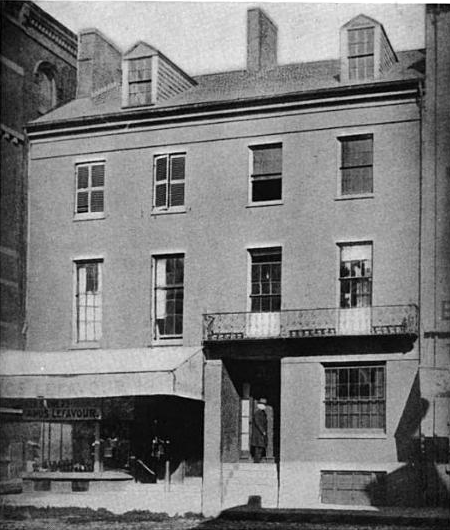
Phillips lived on Essex Street, Boston, 1841–1882

It was Phillips's contention that racial injustice was the source of all of society's ills. Like Garrison, Phillips denounced the Constitution for tolerating slavery. He disagreed with abolitionist Lysander Spooner and maintained that slavery was part of the Constitution, and more generally disputed Spooner's notion that any judge could find slavery illegal. An abolitionist pamphlet penned by Phillips outlined so compellingly that the US Constitution was a slaveholder's legal device to perpetuate slavery that it was recommended by a John C. Calhoun supporter for distribution in the South with only minor alterations.

In 1845, in an essay titled "No Union With Slaveholders", he argued that the country would be better off, and not complicit in their guilt, if it let the slave states secede:

The experience of the fifty years...shows us the slaves trebling in numbers slaveholders monopolizing the offices and dictating the policy of the Government—prostituting the strength and influence of the Nation to the support of slavery here and elsewhere—trampling on the rights of the free States, and making the courts of the country their tools. To continue this disastrous alliance longer is madness. The trial of fifty years only proves that it is impossible for free and slave States to unite on any terms, without all becoming partners in the guilt and responsible for the sin of slavery. Why prolong the experiment? Let every honest man join in the outcry of the American Anti-Slavery Society. (Quoted in Ruchames, The Abolitionists p. 196)

Phillips' alliance with the Garrisonians came with liabilities as many northerners, in both political parties, were devoted to the Union. Anti-slavery constitutionalists considered disunionism among abolitionists a threat to their cause.

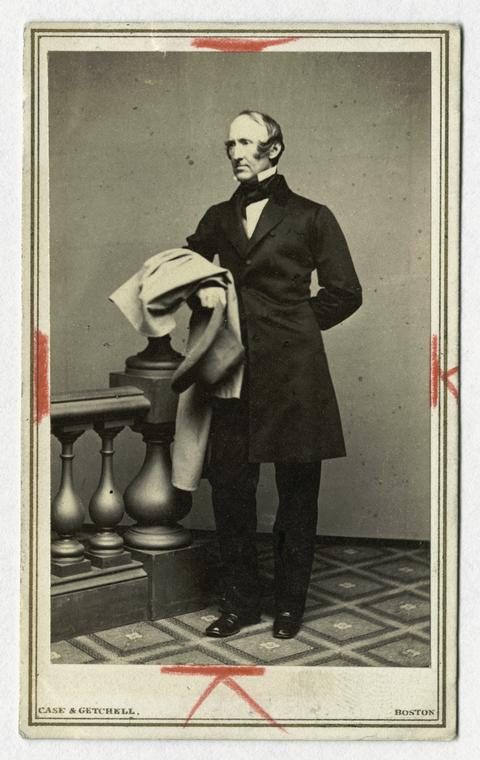
Portrait of Phillips, c. 1863–64; photo by Case & Getchell

On December 8, 1837, in Boston's Faneuil Hall, Phillips' leadership and oratory established his preeminence within the abolitionist movement. Bostonians gathered at Faneuil Hall to discuss Elijah P. Lovejoy's murder by a mob outside his abolitionist newspaper's office in Alton, Illinois, on November 7. Lovejoy died defending himself and his press from pro-slavery rioters who set fire to a warehouse storing his press and shot Lovejoy as he stepped outside to tip a ladder being used by the mob. His death engendered a national controversy between abolitionists and anti-abolitionists.

Anti-Slavery Society Convention 1840, painting by Benjamin Robert Haydon. Move your cursor to identify participants or click the icon to enlarge

At Faneuil Hall, Massachusetts attorney general James T. Austin defended the pro-slavery mob, comparing their actions to 1776 patriots who fought against the British and declaring that Lovejoy "died as the fool dieth!" (Note: The phrase is a reference to 2 Samuel 3:33, "And the king lamented over Abner, and said, 'Died Abner as a fool dieth?'")

The 26-year-old Phillips, infuriated by what he considered a slanderous distortion of the American Revolution, leapt to the stage and denounced Austin in a rousing extemporaneous speech that drew cheers from the audience. The episode catapulted Phillips into a leading position in the American abolitionist movement.

== Trip to Europe ==
The married couple went abroad in 1839 for two years. They spent the summer in Great Britain and the rest of each year in mainland Europe. They made important connections and Ann wrote of them meeting Elizabeth Pease and being particularly impressed by the Quaker abolitionist Richard D. Webb. In 1840 they went to London to join up with other American delegates to the World Anti-Slavery Convention at the Exeter Hall in London. Phillips' new wife was one of a number of female delegates, who included Lucretia Mott, Mary Grew, Sarah Pugh, Abby Kimber, Elizabeth Neall and Emily Winslow. The delegates were astounded to find that female delegates had not been expected and they were not welcome at the convention.

Instructed by his wife not to "shilly-shally", Phillips went in to appeal the case. According to the history of the women's rights movement of Susan B. Anthony's and Elizabeth Cady Stanton, Phillips spoke as the convention opened, scolding the organizers for precipitating an unnecessary conflict:

When the call reached America we found that it was an invitation to the friends of the slave of every nation and of every clime. Massachusetts has for several years acted on the principal of admitting women to an equal seat with men, in the deliberative bodies of the anti-slavery societies.... We stand here in consequence of your invitation, and knowing our custom, as it must be presumed you did, we had a right to interpret 'friends of the slave' to include women as well as men.

The efforts of Phillips and others were only partly successful. The women were allowed in but had to sit separately and were not allowed to talk. This event has been taken by Stanton, Mott, and others as the point at which the women's rights movement began.

== Before the Civil War ==
In 1854, Phillips made a speech at the Boston Courthouse where Anthony Burns, a fugitive slave, was being imprisoned; however, it was believed that he was not involved in the celebrated attempt to rescue Burns.

After John Brown was executed in December 1859, Phillips attended and spoke at his funeral, at the John Brown Farm in remote North Elba, New York. He met Mary Brown and the coffin in Troy, New York, where she changed trains, and expressed, unsuccessfully, his wish that Brown would be buried, with a monument, in Mt. Auburn Cemetery in Cambridge, Massachusetts, which he felt would help the abolitionist cause. He spoke at the funeral and on the way home, repeated his speech the next night to a wildly enthusiastic audience in Vergennes, Vermont.

On the eve of the Civil War, Phillips gave a speech at the New Bedford Lyceum in which he defended the Confederate States' right to secede:

A large body of people, sufficient to make a nation, have come to the conclusion that they will have a government of a certain form. Who denies them the right? Standing with the principles of '76 behind us, who can deny them the right? ...I maintain on the principles of '76 that Abraham Lincoln has no right to a soldier in Fort Sumter. ...You can never make such a war popular. ...The North never will endorse such a war."

In 1860 and 1861, many abolitionists welcomed the formation of the Confederacy because it would end the South's stranglehold over the United States government. This position was rejected by nationalists like Abraham Lincoln, who insisted on holding the Union together while gradually ending slavery. Twelve days after the attack on Fort Sumter, Phillips announced his "hearty and hot" support for the war. Disappointed with what he regarded as Lincoln's slow action, Phillips opposed his reelection in 1864, breaking with Garrison, who supported a candidate for the first time.

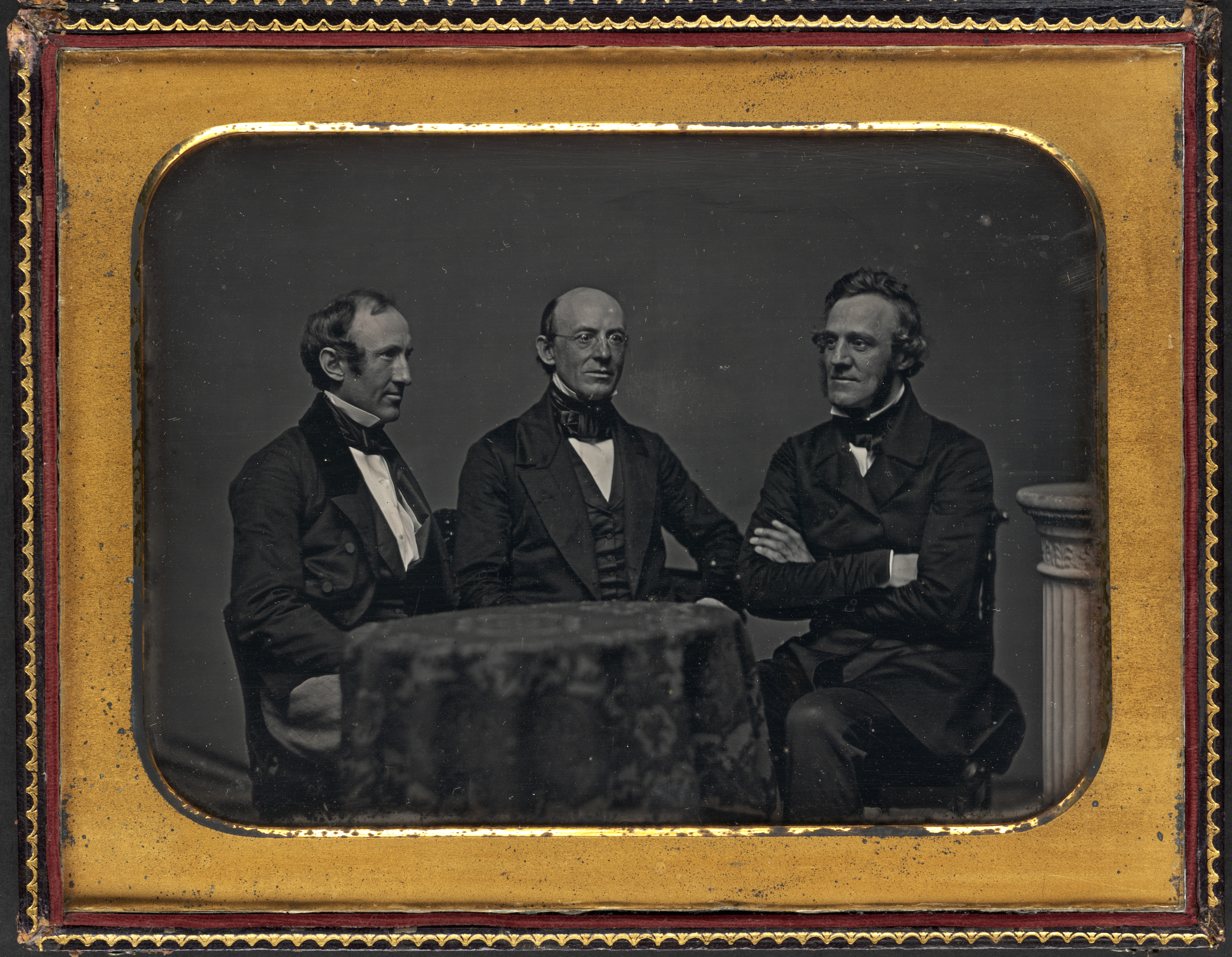
Wendell Phillips, William Lloyd Garrison, and George Thompson, 1851.

In mid-1862, Phillips's nephew, Samuel D. Phillips, died at Port Royal, South Carolina, where he had gone to take part in the so-called Port Royal Experiment to assist the slave population there in the transition to freedom.

== Women's rights activism ==
Phillips was also an early advocate of women's rights. In 1840 he led the unsuccessful effort at the World Anti-Slavery Convention in London to have America's women delegates seated. In the July 3, 1846, issue of The Liberator he called for securing women's rights to their property and earnings as well as to the ballot. He wrote:

I have always thought that the first right restored to woman would be that of the full and unfettered control of all her property and earnings, whether she were married or unmarried. This, too, is, in one sense, the most important to be secured. The responsibility of such a trust at once develops character and intellect, and goes far to afford the hitherto mission and indispensable motive to education. Next in order of importance and time, comes the ballot. So it has always been with all disfranchised classes; first property—then political influence and rights; the first prepares for, gives weight to, challenges, finally secures the second.

In 1849 and 1850, he assisted Lucy Stone in conducting the first woman suffrage petition campaign in Massachusetts, drafting for her both the petition and an appeal for signatures. They repeated the effort the following two years, sending several hundred signatures to the state legislature. In 1853, they directed their petition to a convention charged with revising the state constitution, and sent it petitions bearing five thousand signatures. Together Phillips and Stone addressed the convention's Committee on Qualifications of Voters on May 27, 1853. In 1854, Phillips helped Stone call a New England Woman's Rights convention to expand suffrage petitioning into the other New England states.

Phillips was a member of the National Woman's Rights Central Committee, which organized annual conventions throughout the 1850s, published its Proceedings, and executed plans adopted by the conventions. He was a close adviser of Lucy Stone, and a major presence at most of the conventions, for which he wrote resolutions defining the movement's principles and goals. His address to the 1851 convention, later called "Freedom for Woman", was used as a women's rights tract into the twentieth century. In March 1857, Phillips and Stone were granted hearings by the Massachusetts and Maine legislatures on the woman suffrage memorial sent to twenty-five legislatures by the 1856 National Woman's Rights Convention. As the movement's treasurer, Phillips was trustee with Lucy Stone and Susan B. Anthony of a $5,000 fund given anonymously to the movement in 1858, called the "Phillips fund" until the death of the benefactor, Francis Jackson, in 1861, and thereafter the "Jackson Fund".

== Postwar activism ==
Wendell Phillips with signature

Phillips's philosophical ideal was mainly self-control of the animal, physical self by the human, rational mind, although he admired martyrs like Elijah Lovejoy and John Brown. Historian Gilbert Osofsky has argued that Phillips's nationalism was shaped by a religious ideology derived from the European Enlightenment, as expressed by Thomas Paine, Thomas Jefferson, James Madison, and Alexander Hamilton. The Puritan ideal of a Godly Commonwealth through a pursuit of Christian morality and justice, however, was the main influence on Phillips's nationalism. He favored getting rid of American slavery by letting the slave states secede, and he sought to amalgamate all the American "races". Thus, it was the moral end which mattered most in Phillips's nationalism.

=== Reconstruction Era activism ===
As Northern victory in the Civil War seemed more imminent, Phillips, like many other abolitionists, turned his attention to the questions of Reconstruction. In 1864, he gave a speech at the Cooper Institute in New York arguing that enfranchisement of freedmen should be a necessary condition for the readmission of Southern states to the Union. Unlike other white abolitionist leaders such as Garrison, Phillips thought that securing civil and political rights for freedmen was an essential component of the abolitionist cause, even after the formal legal end of slavery. Along with Frederick Douglass, Phillips argued that without voting rights, the rights of freedmen would be "ground to powder" by white Southerners.

He lamented the passage of the Fourteenth Amendment without provisions for black suffrage, and fervently opposed the Reconstruction regime of President Andrew Johnson, affixing a new masthead to the National Anti-Slavery Standard newspaper which read "Defeat the Amendment–Impeach the President." As Radical Republicans in Congress broke with Johnson and pursued their own Reconstruction policies through the Freedmen's Bureau bills and the Civil Rights Act of 1866, their views converged increasingly with Phillips'. However, most congressional Republicans disagreed with his assertion that "suffrage is nothing but a name because the voter has not...an acre from which he could retire from the persecution of landlordism"; in other words, Phillips and the Republicans diverged on the issue of land redistribution to the freedmen.

Despite his belief that Ulysses S. Grant was not suited for the presidential office and dissatisfaction with Grant's and the party's refusal to endorse his comprehensive Reconstruction program of "land, education and the ballot", Phillips supported Grant and the Republican Party in the 1868 election. The Republicans did pass the Fifteenth Amendment constitutionalizing black suffrage in 1870, but the goal of land redistribution was never realized.

By 1870, Wendell Phillips had joined the short-lived Labor Reform Party, unsuccessfully running for Governor of Massachusetts. Phillips gathered support from labor activists and proponents of temperance and women's suffrage. During this time, Phillips collaborated with leader of the Eight-hour day movement Ira Steward, but the two fell out when Phillips publicly criticized fellow labor activist George E. McNeill.

In 1879, Phillips argued that black suffrage and political participation during Reconstruction had not been a failure, and that the main error of the era had been the failure to redistribute land to the freedmen. He defended black voters as being "less purchasable than the white man," credited black labor and rule for the nascent regrowth of the Southern economy, and commended black bravery against attacks from the first Ku Klux Klan.

As the Reconstruction era came to a close, Phillips increased his attention to other issues, such as women's rights, universal suffrage, temperance, and the labor movement.

=== Equal rights for Native Americans ===
Phillips was also active in efforts to gain equal rights for Native Americans. He proposed that the Andrew Johnson administration create a cabinet-level post that would guarantee Indian rights. Phillips helped create the Massachusetts Indian Commission with Indian rights activist Helen Hunt Jackson and Massachusetts governor William Claflin. Although publicly critical of President Ulysses S. Grant's drinking, he worked with Grant's second administration on the appointment of Indian agents. Phillips lobbied against military involvement in the settling of Native American problems on the Western frontier. He accused General Philip Sheridan of pursuing a policy of Indian extermination.

Public opinion turned against Native American advocates after the Battle of the Little Bighorn in July 1876, but Phillips continued to support the land claims of the Lakota (Sioux). During the 1870s, Phillips arranged public forums for reformer Alfred B. Meacham and Indians affected by the country's Indian removal policy, including the Ponca chief Standing Bear, and the Omaha writer and speaker Susette LaFlesche Tibbles.

== Illness and death ==
By late January 1884, Phillips was suffering from heart disease. Phillips delivered his last public address on January 26, 1884, over the objections of his physician. Phillips spoke at the unveiling of a statue to Harriet Martineau. At the time of the speech, he said that he thought it would be his last.

Phillips died in his home, on Common Street in Boston's neighborhood of Charlestown, on February 2, 1884.

A solemn funeral was held at Hollis Street Church four days later. His body was taken to Faneuil Hall, where it lay in state for several hours. Phillips was then buried at Granary Burying Ground. In April 1886, his remains were exhumed and reburied at Milton Cemetery in Milton.

On February 12, a memorial service was held at the Bethel African Methodist Episcopal Church on Sullivan Street in New York City. Rev. William B. Derrick gave a eulogy, describing Phillips as a friend of humanity and a citizen of the world. Timothy Thomas Fortune also eulogized Phillips, calling him a reformer who was as bold as a lion, who had reformed a great wrong, and who had left a rejuvenated Constitution.

On February 8, in the U.S. House of Representatives, John F. Finerty offered resolutions of respect to the memory of Phillips. William W. Eaton objected to the resolutions.

A memorial event was held in Tremont Temple, Boston, on April 9, 1884. Archibald Grimké delivered a eulogy.

Irish poet and journalist John Boyle O'Reilly, who was a good friend of Phillips, wrote the poem Wendell Phillips in his honor.

== Recognition and legacy ==
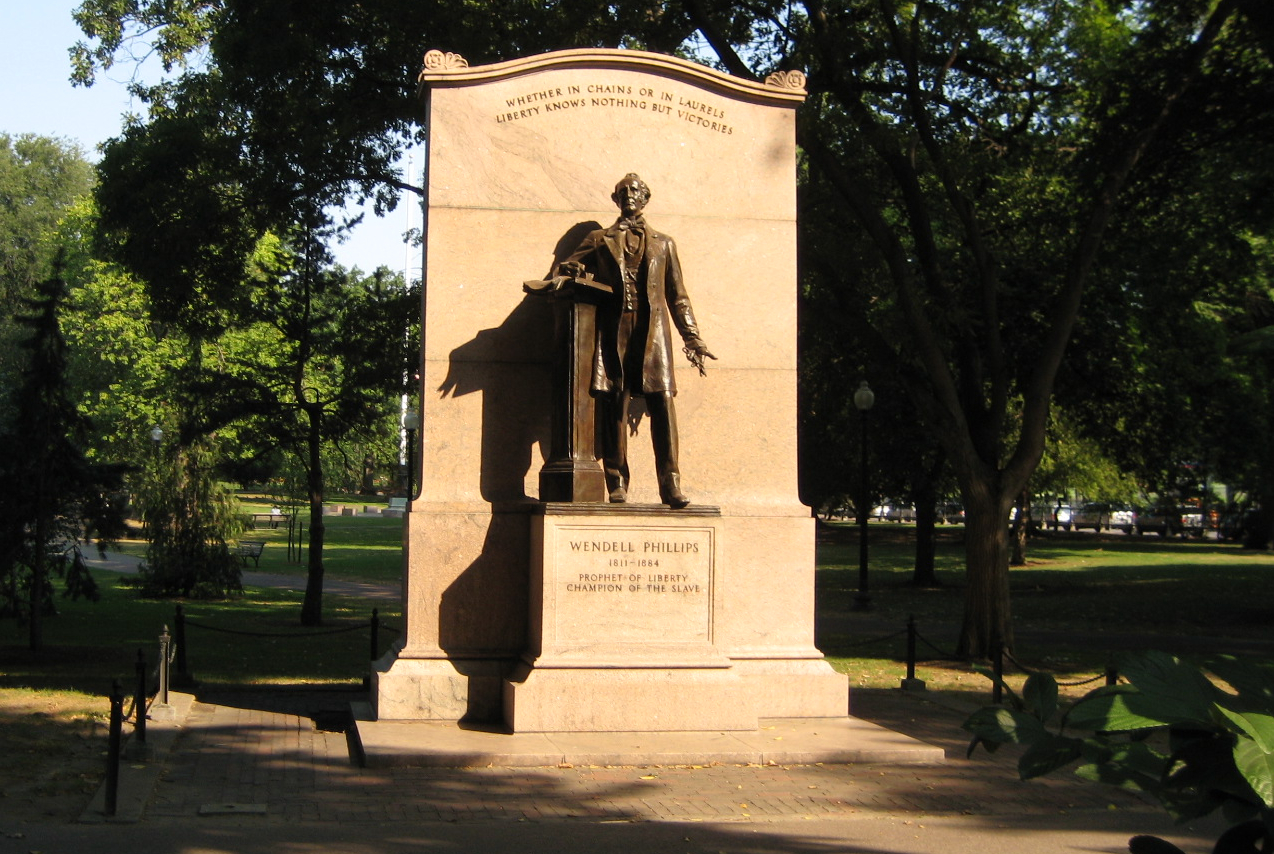
Wendell Phillips Memorial at Boston Public Garden.

In 1904, the Chicago Public Schools opened Wendell Phillips High School in the Bronzeville neighborhood on the south side of Chicago in Phillips's honor.

In July 1915, a monument was erected in Boston Public Garden to commemorate Phillips, inscribed with his words: "Whether in chains or in laurels, liberty knows nothing but victories." Jonathan Harr's "A Civil Action" refers to the statue in recounting Mark Phillips,' a descendant of Wendell Phillips,' reaction to a legal victory in the case against W.R. Grace & Co. et al.

The Phillips community in Minneapolis was named after him.

A phrase from his speech of January 20, 1861, "I think the first duty of society is justice," sometimes wrongly attributed to Alexander Hamilton, appears on various courthouses around the United States, including in Nashville, Tennessee.

The Wendell Phillips School in Washington, D.C., was named in his honor in 1890. The school closed in 1950 and was turned into the Phillips School Condominium in 2002.

== See also ==
- Dyer Lum, labor activist and abolitionist who ran for Lieutenant Governor of Massachusetts on Phillips's ticket.
- "Wendell Phillips Before the Concord Lyceum"
