= Boston & Roxbury Mill Dam =

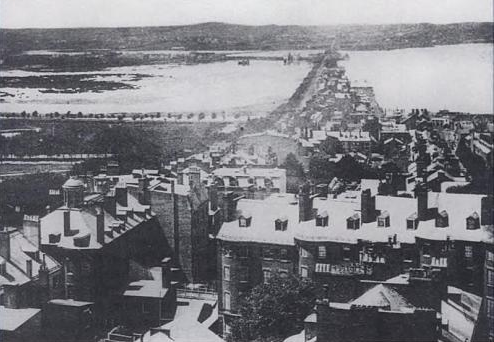
- An 1858 view of the Boston Milldam

- Location within Massachusetts
- Location: Boston, Massachusetts
- Coordinates: 42°21′13.19″N 71°4′44.63″W
- Purpose: Industrial production, transportation
- Construction began: 1818
- Opening date: 1821
- Construction cost: $700,000 ($243 million with inflation)

The Boston & Roxbury Mill Dam was an engineering project in Boston's Back Bay. Commissioned in 1814, the project intended to enclose the Back Bay basin and utilize flowing tidal waters for industrial production. Constructing the dam would allow water to reliably flow from the Charles River to the basin, creating an ideal environment for the era's industrial mills. The project additionally added a second route to the mainland that redirected traffic away from Boston's choked Orange Street causeway. Between 1818 and 1821, the dam was constructed by extending Beacon Street westward.

== Geography ==
The Boston Milldam occupied what is today the westward extension of Beacon Street. Prior to the construction of the Milldam, Beacon Street ended at the foot of Charles Street – Back Bay's tidal basin prevented any further construction. The dam had two arms, one stretching from Beacon Hill to Sewall's Point (today, Kenmore Square) and one stretching from Roxbury's Gravelly Point. These sections of the dam enclosed the back bay in a 600-acre tidal basin. The tidal basin was later filled in and is now occupied by the Back Bay Neighborhood.

== Construction ==
The idea for the Milldam was conceived by Uriah Cotting, a real estate merchant who had established a reputation for developing the Boston waterfront. Boston historian Justin Winsor described Cotting as "the projector and guiding spirit in nearly every enterprise involving the development of the town for business during the first twenty years" of the 19th century. The idea was developed in response to a shortage of industrial goods during the War of 1812, for Cotting believed Boston's tides could be utilized to power factories.

On June 14, 1814, the Massachusetts Legislature approved the construction of the dam. However, a slow industrial economy following the War of 1812 delayed the dam's immediate construction. Despite the economic troubles, merchants were eager to invest in the dam. Cotting predicted that the dam would yield 81 mills and cost $250,000, but bring in $520,000 a year in revenue. It would also provide a second route to the towns of Brookline, Brighton, and Watertown. Construction began in 1818 and would continue until 1821. Cotting died two years prior to the dam's completion in 1819. Constructed from stone, one arm of the dam was built from the foot of Beacon Hill to Sewell's Point (now Kenmore Square) in Brookline. A second cross-dam was constructed from Gravelly Point in Roxbury, dividing Back Bay into two basins of 600 combined acres. At high tide the waters of the Charles River would enter the westerly basin, pass through channels to generate turbine power, and then empty back into the Charles at low tide.

== Failure and aftermath ==
The Milldam project is regarded as a failure. Construction ran significantly over budget, costing nearly $700,000 instead of the proposed $250,000. Only three factories would become established along Boston's waters instead of the predicted 81. Pollution also became a problem immediately after the construction of the Milldam. Enclosing the dam led to stagnant and foul water, precipitating several complaints by the residents of Boston. Cotton's reputation was saved by his early death, but the Boston & Roxbury Mill Corporation was negatively impacted by the dam's failure. The Milldam would persist for several more decades. To use the dirty, derelict bay for practical purposes, the Back Bay land reclamation project was commissioned in 1857 to construct new residential neighborhoods over the tidal basin. Boston and Roxbury Mill Corporation thus signed over the rights to the land in 1859. The seawall was extended to fill in the Back Bay mudflats in order to accommodate the new construction. The failure of the Milldam prevented Back Bay from becoming an industrial district, leading to its current incarnation as a rich collection of 19th-century residences.
