= New England Non-Resistance Society =

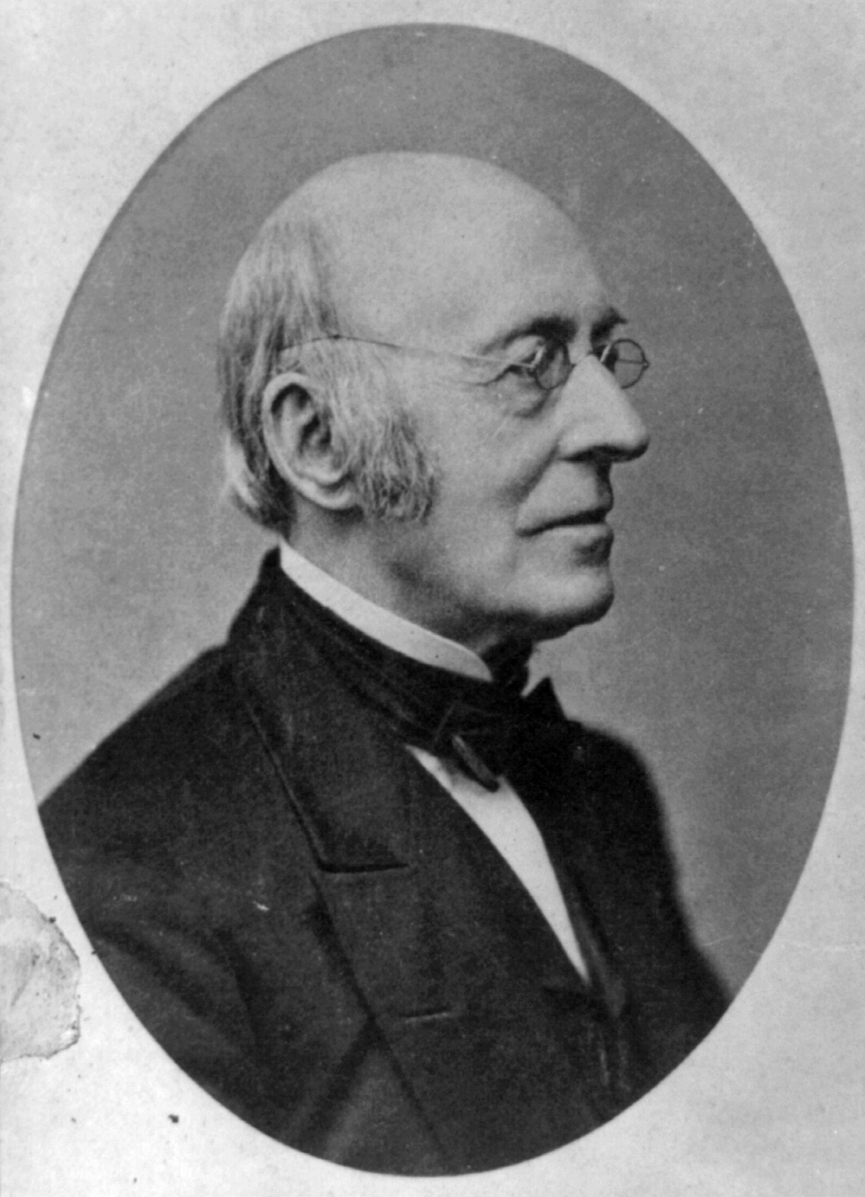
William Lloyd Garrison

The New England Non-Resistance Society was an American peace group founded at a special peace convention organized by William Lloyd Garrison, in Boston in September 1838. Leading up to the convention, conservative members of the American Anti-Slavery Society and the American Peace Society expressed discomfort with Garrison's philosophy of "non-resistance" and inclusion of women in public political activities. After conservative attendees opposing Garrison walked out of the convention in protest, those remaining formed the New England Non-Resistance Society.

The Society condemned the use of force in resisting evil, in war, for the death penalty, or in self-defense, renounced allegiance to human government, and because of the anti-slavery cause, favored non-union with the American South.

The New England Non-Resistance Society was one of the more radical of the many organizations founded by William Lloyd Garrison, adopting a Declaration of Sentiments of which he was the principal author, pledging themselves to deny the validity of social distinctions based on race, nationality or gender", refusing obedience to human governments, and opposing even individual acts of self-defense. In the Society's Declaration of Sentiments, Garrison wrote, "any person without distinction of sex or color, who consents to the principles of this Constitution may become a member and be entitled to speak at its meetings." The Society rejected loyalty to any human government; one historian has described the Non-Resistance Society's "basic outlook as that of philosophical anarchism".

The declaration was signed by 44 people, of whom 20 were women. Maria Chapman became the editor of its publication, The Non-Resistant (1839 - 1840), along with Edmund Quincy), and William Lloyd Garrison and started publication in 1839. The first annual meeting was held in Philadelphia, Sept 24–27, 1839. The publication lasted only two years but was indicative of the millennial character of parts of the reform movement.

Among the members were Adin Ballou (president), Amos Bronson Alcott, Maria Weston Chapman, Stephen Symonds Foster, Abby Kelley, Samuel May, and Henry C. Wright.

The Non-Resistance Society held its last meeting in 1849.

The organization has been considered by one historian to be a "relatively exclusive vehicle of the radical [Boston] upper class"
