= Anti-slavery fairs =

Anti-slavery fairs were meetings in the 1830s through 1860s where American abolitionists, particularly women, sold goods and distributed and discussed anti-slavery ideas.

== Early anti-slavery gatherings ==
Sewing circles provided women with intense exposure to anti-slavery literature, slogans, and leaders. These circles were most prominent from 1835 to 1860. Women involved in these circles had an extreme devotion to them. Many of the women devoted to abolition were very religious, particularly different denominations of Christianity. Their belief and understanding of slavery was that it was not moral in their religion. What started out as small sewing circles grew into larger fairs. Eventually, anti-slavery propaganda was spread alongside the selling of baked goods, clothing items, and common household items. This resulted in it being difficult for even non-committed attendees at the fairs to ignore the central message of abolition. Customers of all ages, genders, and races were exposed to the message of anti-slavery through these fairs as they came to buy homemade and manufactured goods. As fairs became larger, they moved from homes and churches into hotels, stores, and meeting halls.

== Growing support ==
The Boston and Philadelphia fairs were sponsors for the first anti-slavery sales in 1834 and 1836. Smaller fairs were able to donate and sell items at the larger fairs like Boston and Philadelphia which provided advertisement for the message of anti-slavery as well as helped smaller fairs rise among the Northeast. By 1848 Boston, Philadelphia, and several smaller fairs received material and moral support from anti-slavery advocates in Ireland, Scotland, and Britain. Selling foreign goods helped to boost attendance from the general public to the fairs. Sales of British goods brought in almost half of the Boston Female Anti-Slavery Society’s treasury‘s income in the 1850s. Women in charge of organizing the fairs continued to call for even more support by inviting all people to participate by donating or selling their goods. These could include dry goods, products from a farm or garden, sewn items, toys, books, or art. Larger anti-slavery groups, like the one in Philadelphia also made efforts to support smaller sewing circles that gained popularity in the West as well, like in Ohio. Larger fairs made sure to publish notes of thanks for all smaller sewing circles that contributed goods to encourage them and thank them for their support.

== Intersectionality of anti-slavery fairs ==
Middle class white women played the biggest role in the organization of these fairs. However, black women often contributed homemade goods to be sold and white men often donated money or goods to be sold as well. This allowed for men and women both black and white to work and socialize together, which the abolitionists saw as a way to break down racial and gender barriers in public spaces. Anti-slavery fairs were a way that women, especially in the Northeast United States, pushed the bounds of "separate spheres" for men and women. The voluntary work of women at these fairs gave women a stronger voice in politics and a stronger influence in the local economies.

== Contributors ==
The Weston sisters were a group that contributed largely to the anti-slavery cause. They were educated, middle class, white women from Weymouth, Massachusetts. One of the sisters, Maria Weston Chapman, married an abolitionist that helped connect the other five sisters, who never married, to the anti-slavery movement. They became leaders in the Boston female Anti-Slavery Society where they became very influential despite resistance towards women performing activism in public spaces. Maria Weston Chapman also was an editor of the Liberty Bell! which published essays, stories, and poems about slaves and abolition. Much of the success that Maria Weston Chapman brought to the anti-slavery fairs that she was involved in can be attributed to her extensive connections with wealthy families throughout Boston and much of Massachusetts.
