= 1836 Abolition riot =

Courtroom disruption in Boston, Massachusetts

The Abolition Riot of 1836 took place in Boston, Massachusetts in the Massachusetts Supreme Judicial Court. In August 1836, Eliza Small and Polly Ann Bates, two enslaved women from Baltimore who had run away, were arrested in Boston and brought before Chief Justice Lemuel Shaw. The judge ordered them freed because of a problem with the arrest warrant. When the agent for their enslaver requested a new warrant, the spectators—mostly African-American women—rioted in the courtroom and rescued Small and Bates.

The incident was one of several slave rescue efforts that took place in Boston. Controversy over the fate of George Latimer led to the passage of the 1843 Liberty Act, which prohibited the arrest of fugitive slaves in Massachusetts. Abolitionists rose to the defense of Ellen and William Craft in 1850, Shadrach Minkins in 1851, and Anthony Burns in 1854. An attempt to rescue Thomas Sims in 1852 was unsuccessful.

== Background ==
In 1836, Boston was home to about 1,875 free African Americans, some of whom were refugees from slave states. The vast majority were committed to abolitionism; among the more outspoken activists were William Cooper Nell, Maria Stewart, and David Walker. Some, such as Lewis Hayden and John T. Hilton, devoted their lives to assisting fugitive slaves.

On Saturday, July 30, Captain Henry Eldridge sailed into Boston Harbor on the Chickasaw. Among his passengers were two African-American women, Eliza Small and Polly Ann Bates, both of whom carried legal documents declaring them free women. Before the ship docked it was boarded by Matthew Turner, the agent of a wealthy Baltimore slaveholder named John B. Morris. Turner claimed that Small and Bates were fugitive slaves belonging to Morris. Eldridge agreed to detain the women on his ship until Turner returned with a warrant for their arrest.

As news of the incident circulated, a large group of black Bostonians gathered on the wharf. One of them sought out attorney Samuel Edmund Sewall, (Note: Levy refers to Sewall as "Samuel Eliot Sewall," but the memoir of Samuel Edmund Sewall (1799–1888) includes a firsthand account of the incident. See Tiffany (1898), pp. 62–66.) who obtained a writ of habeas corpus from Chief Justice Lemuel Shaw. The captain was forced to release the women pending a hearing on his authority to detain them. When Deputy Sheriff Huggerford served the writ, accompanied by Sewall, they found Small and Bates locked in their cabin in a state of distress. Upon being apprised of the situation, one of the women—whom Sewall later described as "a very pretty and intelligent mulatto"—burst into tears and said she had known the Lord would not forsake her. (Note: Both women were probably multiracial; in a letter to Sewall, Nathan Winslow refers to them as "the Yellow Girls." See Tiffany (1898), p. 64.)

Shaw happened to be unavailable for the rest of the day. Rather than hear the case himself, Justice Wilde postponed the hearing until the following Monday, on the technical grounds that it was Shaw who had signed the writ. At 9:00 on the morning of August 1, as Chief Justice Shaw took the bench, the courtroom filled with spectators. Most were black women; a few white abolitionists joined them, including five women from the Boston Female Anti-Slavery Society.

== Court hearing ==
The purpose of the hearing, as defined by the writ, was to determine whether Eldridge had the right to detain Small and Bates. Counsel on both sides, however, addressed the more general question of slavery itself. Attorney A. H. Fiske, representing Eldridge, read an affidavit by Turner declaring that the women were the property of his employer, and cited the Fugitive Slave Act of 1793. He then moved for a postponement of the hearing to give him time to bring evidence from Baltimore that the women were slaves. Sewall argued that Eldridge had no right to hold the women, and moreover, that all human beings were born free and had a natural right to remain so. When he finished, the audience burst into applause.

Chief Justice Shaw rose to give his opinion. The question before the Court, he said, was simply: "Has the captain of the brig Chickasaw a right to convert his vessel into a prison?" Shaw determined that Eldridge had no such right and had detained the women unlawfully. He concluded by declaring that "the prisoners must therefore be discharged from all further detention."

Turner, the slaveholder's agent, rose and asked the judge if he would need a warrant to arrest the women again under the provisions of the Fugitive Slave Law. At the same time, a constable was sent to lock the door that led downstairs. It appeared to the spectators that Turner was about to detain the women a second time, despite their having just been discharged by Judge Shaw.

== Riot ==
Before the judge could answer Turner's question, Sewall advised the women to leave at once. Someone shouted, "Go! Go!" and the crowd spontaneously erupted. People rushed over the seats and down the aisle toward Small and Bates. Outside, several hundred others pressed on the doors, trying to force their way in. Shaw protested, but the crowd ignored him, shouting, "Don't stop!" The only officer in the room, Deputy Sheriff Huggerford, was grabbed by "an old colored woman, of great size," who threw her arms around his neck and stopped him from interfering. Swarming around the two women, the crowd made its way down a private passageway of the judiciary and down the courthouse stairs. Once outside, the women were hustled into a carriage, which sped out of the city at a gallop.

Huggerford and several others pursued the fleeing women, but they were too late. As the carriage crossed over Mill Dam, money was thrown from the carriage to pay the toll.

== Aftermath ==
Although Boston was an important center of the abolitionist movement, its residents were by no means unanimously opposed to slavery or the Fugitive Slave Law. On the contrary, the local press excoriated Huggerford and Sheriff C. P. Sumner (father of abolitionist Charles Sumner) for not having placed more officers at the courthouse. The riot was seen as a shocking affront to law and order. Several journalists were particularly offended by the "indecent conduct" of the female abolitionists, and one called on the women's husbands to chastise them. Another accused Sewall of disgracing the legal profession and called for his censure by the bar for "instigating a mob of negroes to perpetrate an act at which every good member of society shudders." Even the Liberator, the anti-slavery newspaper founded by William Lloyd Garrison, expressed mild disapproval, calling the incident "unjustifiable" but "not unpardonable."

Small and Bates were never recaptured; they eventually made it to Canada, where slavery had been abolished three years before. None of the rioters were ever brought to trial. The editor of the Columbian Centinel fulminated:

The outrage was committed by a mob of several hundreds, and after three days search, neither the prisoners nor one of the rioters have been arrested. Is there no person who was present who can identify one of the offenders? Could such a scene be enacted, and the Chief Justice be assailed vi et armis in the face of day, and in open court, and no person be able to detect one of a hundred? The case has not its parallel in the annals of crime.

Sewall received many threatening and abusive letters, warning him never to set foot in Baltimore and alluding to Judge Lynch. Four weeks after the riot, a U.S. naval officer from Baltimore confronted Sewall in his office. After announcing that he was related to Morris, he insulted Sewall and struck him "a number of blows with the butt end of a horsewhip." Undeterred, Sewall volunteered his services in a number of other cases defending fugitive slaves.

Writing in the Liberator sixteen years later, William Cooper Nell recalled the rescue as a testament to "the prowess of a few coloured women; the memory of which deed is sacredly cherished and transmitted to posterity."
