= Boston Female Anti-Slavery Society =

American abolitionist organization (1833–1840)

The Boston Female Anti-Slavery Society (1833–1840) was an abolitionist, interracial organization in Boston, Massachusetts, in the mid-19th century. "During its brief history ... it orchestrated three national women's conventions, organized a multistate petition campaign, sued southerners who brought slaves into Boston, and sponsored elaborate, profitable fundraisers."

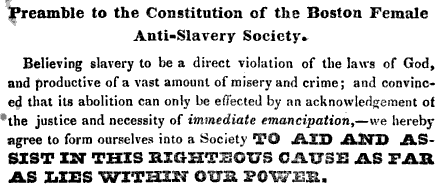
From the constitution of the Boston Female Anti-Slavery Society, c. 1836

== Philosophy ==
The founders believed "slavery to be a direct violation of the laws of God, and productive of a vast amount of misery and crime, and convinced that its abolition can only be effected by an acknowledgement of the justice and necessity of immediate emancipation." The society aimed to "aid and assist in this righteous cause as far as lies within our power. ... Its funds shall be appropriated to the dissemination of truth on the subject of slavery, and the improvement of the moral and intellectual character of the colored population." The group was independent of state and national organizations.

While the BFASS (Boston Female Anti-Slavery Society) was whites-only for its first six-months, they quickly became integrated. This was born from their desire to attack slavery with vigor. The BFASS believed that complacency or apathy towards slavery was unacceptable and, that many anti-slavery societies were not doing enough to fight for abolition. Their movement was also rooted in a belief that the days of slavery were rapidly coming to an end, and they wanted to be on the forefront of this new day. This marked a dramatic upsurge in women's activity with Boston's abolitionist movement, one that would continue to grow into the Civil War.

== History ==
On October 21, 1835, the Society announced that British abolitionist George Thompson would be speaking. Pro-slavery forces posted nearly 500 notices of a $100 reward for the citizen that would first lay violent hands on him. Thompson canceled at the last minute, and Wm. Lloyd Garrison, editor and publisher of the abolitionist newspaper The Liberator, was quickly scheduled to speak in his place. A lynch mob formed, forcing Garrison to escape through the back of the hall and hide in a carpenter's shop. The mob soon found him, putting a noose around his neck to drag him away. Several strong men, including the mayor Theodore Lyman II, intervened and took him to the most secure place in Boston, the Leverett Street Jail.

In 1836 the Society joined with other groups in suing for habeas corpus in the "freedom suit" known as Commonwealth v. Aves. They sought freedom for the young slave girl Med, whose mistress had brought her to Boston from New Orleans on a trip. The court decided in favor of the slave's freedom and made Med a ward of the court. The decision caused an uproar in the South and added to tensions over slaveholders' travel to free states, as well as the hardening of positions in the years leading up to the Civil War. It was the first case in which a slave was determined to be free soon after being brought voluntarily to a free state. That same year, the Society was involved in the Abolition Riot of 1836.

In 1837, leaders of the society included Lucy M. Ball, Martha Violet Ball, Mary G. Chapman, Eunice Davis, Mary S. Parker, Sophia Robinson, Henrietta Sargent, and her sister Catherine Sargent. Southwick, Catherine M. Sullivan, Anne Warren Weston, Caroline Weston, and Maria Weston Chapman. Other affiliates of the society included Mary Grew, Joshua V. Himes, Francis Jackson, Maria White Lowell, Harriet Martineau, Abby Southwick, Baron Stow, Ann Terry Greene Phillips, Mrs. George Thompson.

The society held a number of anti-slavery fairs in which women could embroider or sew articles with anti-slavery mottoes on them, and then sell them to attendees to fund raise for their group. The Boston Fair was the largest one, but it inspired smaller fairs for the other female antislavery groups as well. Including the Fall River Female Anti-Slavery Society, which not only attended the Boston fair with their products to sell, but there is reports of them selling their articles in Fall River as well. This was used to fund raise for their group too.

Delegates from the Boston Female Anti-Slavery Society also attended the Anti-Slavery Convention of American Women, which included delegates from various female lead anti-slavery groups around the country to discuss the rights of African American women. They had a system in which they would choose leads for the convention and more than once Mary S. Parker from the Boston group was chosen as president. An African American woman who was also a member, Martha V. Ball was also chosen as one of the secretaries.

== Division and dissolution ==
Infighting and factionalism characterized the society after a few years. "Within 7 short years, BFASS had risen to national prominence, only to dissolve amid confusion, acrimony, and ... bitterness."

== See also ==
- The Liberty Bell (annual)
