= Maria Weston Chapman =

American abolitionist (1806–1885)

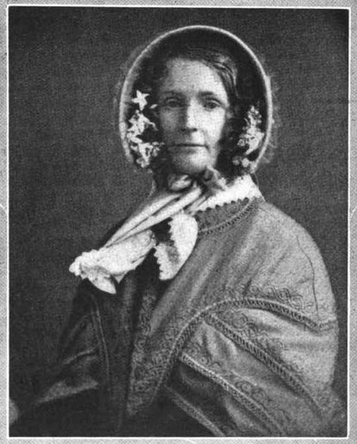
- Chapman, from a 1910 publication
- Born: Maria Weston; July 25, 1806; Weymouth, Massachusetts, U.S.
- Died: July 12, 1885 (aged 78); Weymouth, Massachusetts, U.S.
- Spouse: Henry Grafton Chapman (m. 1830; died 1842)
- Children: 4
- Parent(s): Anne Bates Weston; Warren Weston
- Relatives: John Jay Chapman (grandson); Eleanor Chapman (granddaughter)

Maria Weston Chapman (July 25, 1806 – July 12, 1885) was an American abolitionist. She was elected to the executive committee of the American Anti-Slavery Society in 1839 and from 1839 until 1842, she served as editor of the anti-slavery journal The Non-Resistant.

== Early life ==
Maria Weston was born in 1806 in Weymouth, Massachusetts to Captain Warren Richard Weston and Anne (née Bates) Weston. Eventually she had seven younger siblings—five sisters and two brothers. Though the Westons were not wealthy, they were well connected through her uncle's patronage. She spent several years of her youth living with family in England, where she received a robust education.

Weston returned to Boston in 1828 to serve as principal of a newly-founded, socially-progressive girls' high school. She left the field of education two years later to marry.

== Abolitionism ==
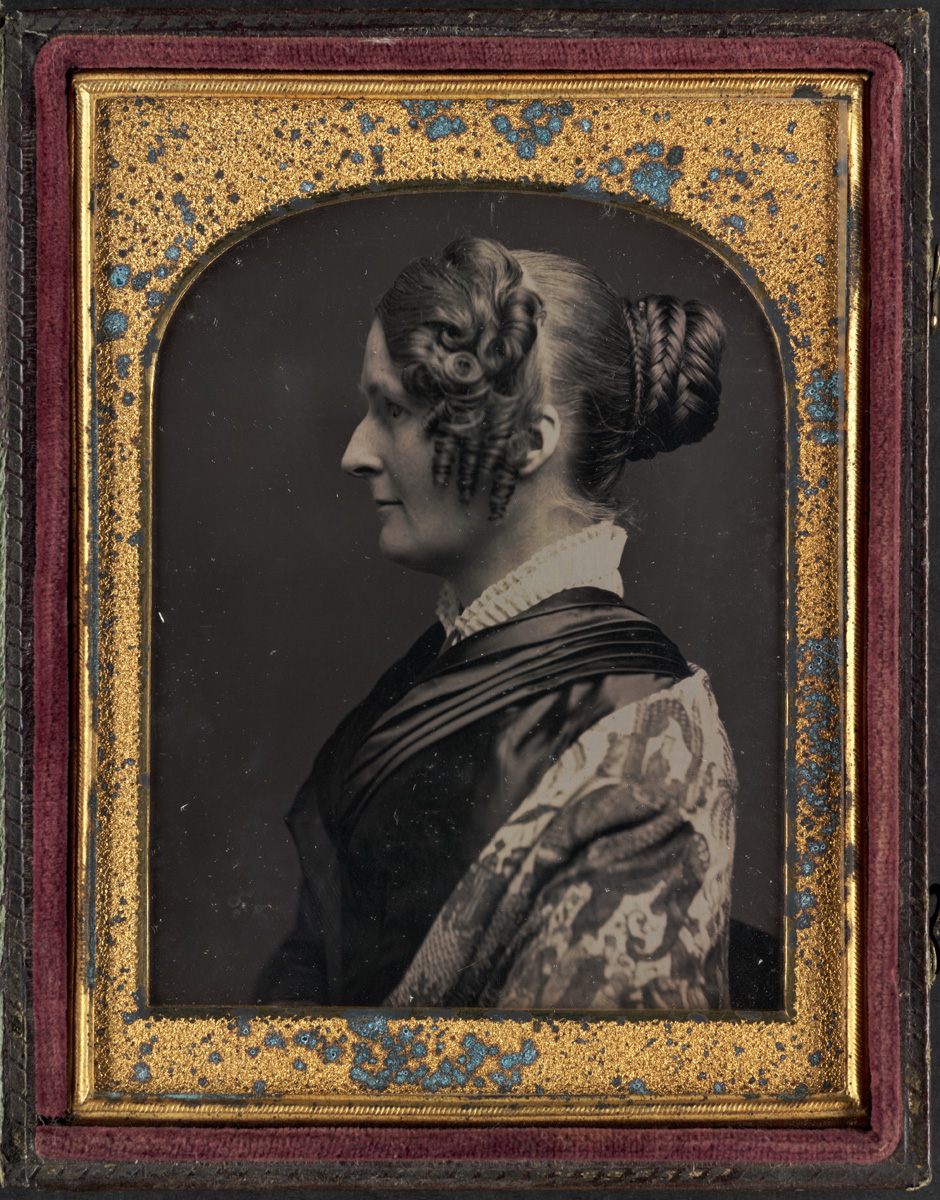
Maria Weston Chapman

Maria and her husband Henry were both "Garrisonian" abolitionists, meaning that they believed in an "immediate" and uncompromising end to slavery, brought about by "moral suasion" or non-resistance. They rejected all political and institutional coercion—including churches, political parties and the federal government—as agencies for ending slavery. They did, however, support moral coercion that encompassed "come-outerism" and disunion, both of which opposed association with slaveholders. Gerald Sorin writes, "In [Maria's] nonresistance principles and in her 'come-outerism,' she was rigidly dogmatic and self-righteous, believing that 'when one is perfectly right, one neither asks nor needs sympathy.'"

=== Anti-slavery work ===
Though Chapman came to the anti-slavery cause through her husband's family, she quickly and stalwartly took up the cause, enduring pro-slavery mobs, social ridicule, and public attacks on her character. Her sisters, notably Caroline and Anne, were also active abolitionists, though Maria is generally considered to be the most outspoken and active among her family. According to Lee V. Chambers, through their "kin-work", the sisters supported each other through family responsibilities in order to take their active public roles. The Chapmans became central figures in the "Boston Clique," which primarily consisted of wealthy and socially prominent supporters of William Lloyd Garrison. In 1835, Chapman assumed the leadership of the Boston Anti-Slavery Bazaar, which had been founded the previous year by Lydia Maria Child and Louisa Loring as a major fundraising event. She directed the fair until 1858, when she unilaterally decided to replace the bazaar with the Anti-Slavery Subscription Anniversary. Chapman said that the fair had become passé; she argued that the Anniversary—an exclusive, invitation-only soirée featuring music, food and speeches—was more au courant and would raise more funds than the bazaar. As described by historian Benjamin Quarles, through these years Chapman and other abolitionists became experienced in using "all the refined techniques of solicitation" in their fundraising for the cause of abolitionism.

In addition to her fair work, between 1835 and 1865, Chapman served on the executive and business committees of the Massachusetts Anti-Slavery Society (MASS), the New England Anti-Slavery Society (NEASS) and the American Anti-Slavery Society (AASS). Through these she was active in the petition campaigns of the 1830s. She wrote the annual reports of the Boston Female Anti-Slavery Society (BFASS) and published tracts to raise public awareness.

For nearly 20 years, between 1839 and 1858, Chapman edited The Liberty Bell, an annual anti-slavery gift book sold at the Boston Bazaar as part of fundraising. The giftbook was composed of contributions from various notable figures: Longfellow, Emerson, Elizabeth Barrett Browning, Harriet Martineau, and Bayard Taylor, among others, none of whom was paid for their contributions aside from a copy of The Liberty Bell. She also served as editor to The Liberator in Garrison's absence, and was on the editorial committee of the National Anti-Slavery Standard, the official mouthpiece of the AASS. Chapman was also a member of the peace organisation, the Non-Resistance Society, which published The Non-Resistant.

Chapman was a prolific writer in her own right, publishing Right and Wrong in Massachusetts in 1839 and How Can I Help to Abolish Slavery? in 1855. Aside from these works, she published her poems and essays in abolitionist periodicals. In 1840 divisions between Garrisonians and the more political wing of the anti-slavery movement split the AASS and correspondingly the BFASS into two opposing factions. Maria, nicknamed "Captain Chapman" and the "great goddess" by her opponents and "Lady Macbeth" even by her friends, outmaneuvered the opposition. She took control of a resurrected BFASS, which from then on mainly focused on organizing the Boston bazaar as a major fundraiser for abolitionism.

The church she attended, Federal Street Church, Unitarian, is featured on the Boston Women's Heritage Trail.

=== Travels ===
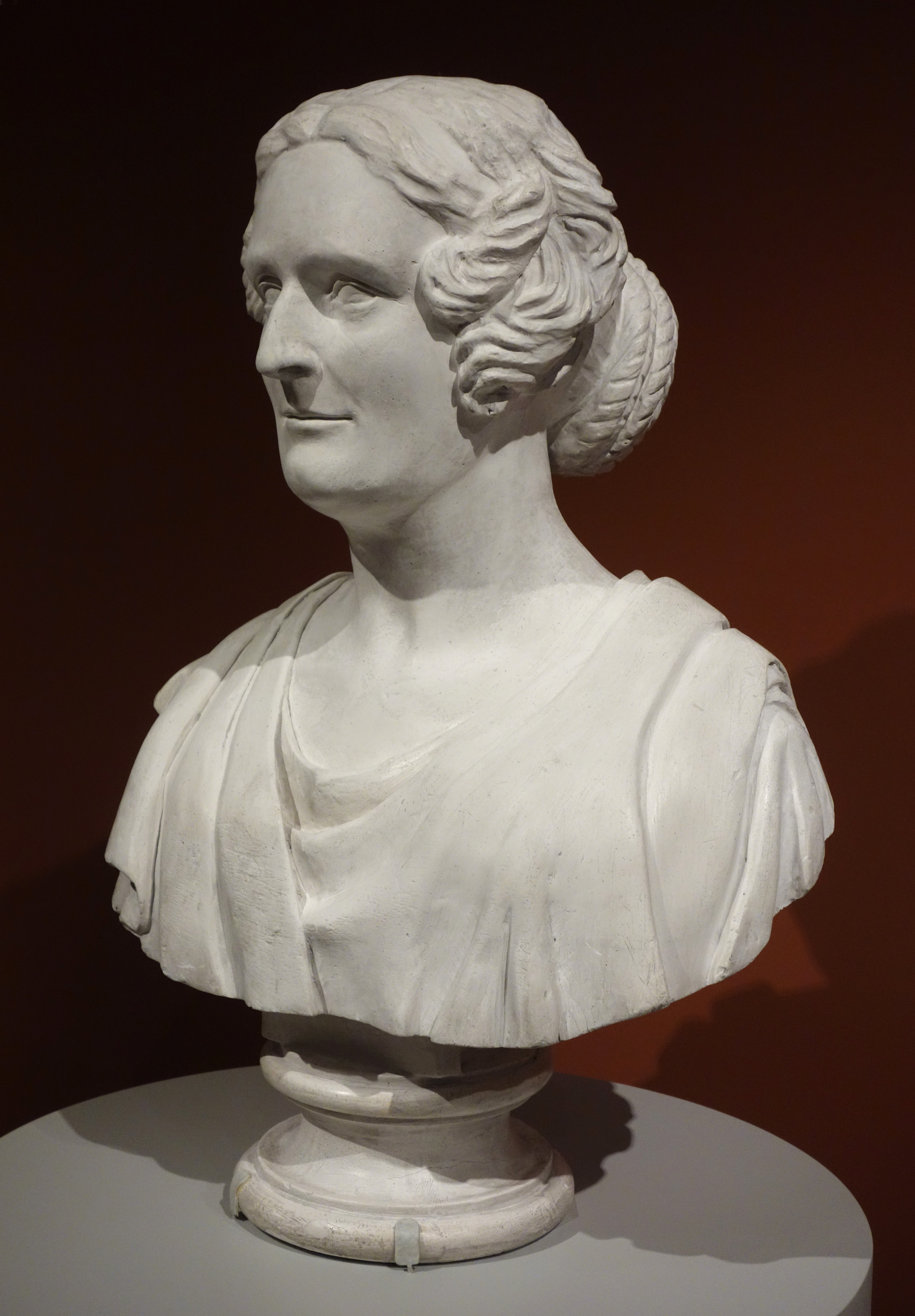
Bust of Chapman by Edmonia Lewis, c. 1865

Throughout her three decades of involvement in the anti-slavery movement, Chapman spent considerable amounts of time outside of the United States, first in Haiti (1841-1842) and later in Paris (1848-1855). In spite of her prolonged absences, she still figured centrally in the Boston movement generally and the Boston bazaar particularly. While abroad, she tenaciously solicited support and contributions for the Boston fairs from elite members of British and European society, such as Lady Byron, Harriet Martineau, Alexis de Tocqueville, Victor Hugo, and Alphonse de Lamartine.

When she returned to the U.S. in 1855, "Bloody Kansas" and the rise of the Republican Party brought the issue of slavery to the centre of national debate. It was in this period that Chapman began to manifestly deviate from Garrisonian ideology, by endorsing the Republican party and later by supporting both the American Civil War and Abraham Lincoln's proposal in 1862 for gradual compensated slave emancipation. Unlike many Garrisonians such as Garrison himself, Chapman gave no indication of being conflicted between the principle of non-coercion and the Civil War's objective of abolishing slavery through violent force. Characteristically, Chapman was as resolute and unapologetic in her new beliefs as she had been in her old. Yet, in spite of her newly-expressed confidence in the state, Chapman seemingly felt little responsibility to former slaves once they had been freed.

== Personal life ==
In 1830, Henry Grafton Chapman (1804–1842), a second-generation abolitionist and wealthy Boston merchant; his parents were enthusiastic abolitionists. By all accounts, the Chapmans had a good marriage that was free from ideological and financial strain. During their 12-year marriage, which ended in Henry's death from tuberculosis in 1842, they had four children, one of whom died in early childhood, including:

- Henry Grafton Chapman Jr. (1833–1883), who married Eleanor Kingsland Jay (1839–1921), the daughter of John Jay, the U.S. Minister to Austria-Hungary, granddaughter of William Jay and great-granddaughter of John Jay, Chief Justice of the United States Supreme Court.

In 1863, except for a passing interest in the AASS, Chapman retired from public life, and for the next two decades, until her death in Weymouth on July 12, 1885, she "savored the perceived success of her cause and, equally, her own role in the victory." In 1961, 76 years after her death she would receive a middle school in her name often referred to as "Chapman Middle School" or just "Chapman" by students who attend there.

== Works ==
- Songs of the Free and Hymns of Christian Freedom (1836)
- Right and Wrong in Boston (1836)
- Right and Wrong in Massachusetts (1839)
- "Pinda: A True Tale" (1840)
- "The Times That Try Men's Souls" (1848)
- "How Can I Help Abolish Slavery? or, Counsels to the Newly Converted" (1855) - also at Gutenberg.org
- Memorials of Harriet Martineau (1877)

== See also ==
- Edward Strutt Abdy
