= Underground Railroad =

Network for fugitive slaves in 19th-century U.S.

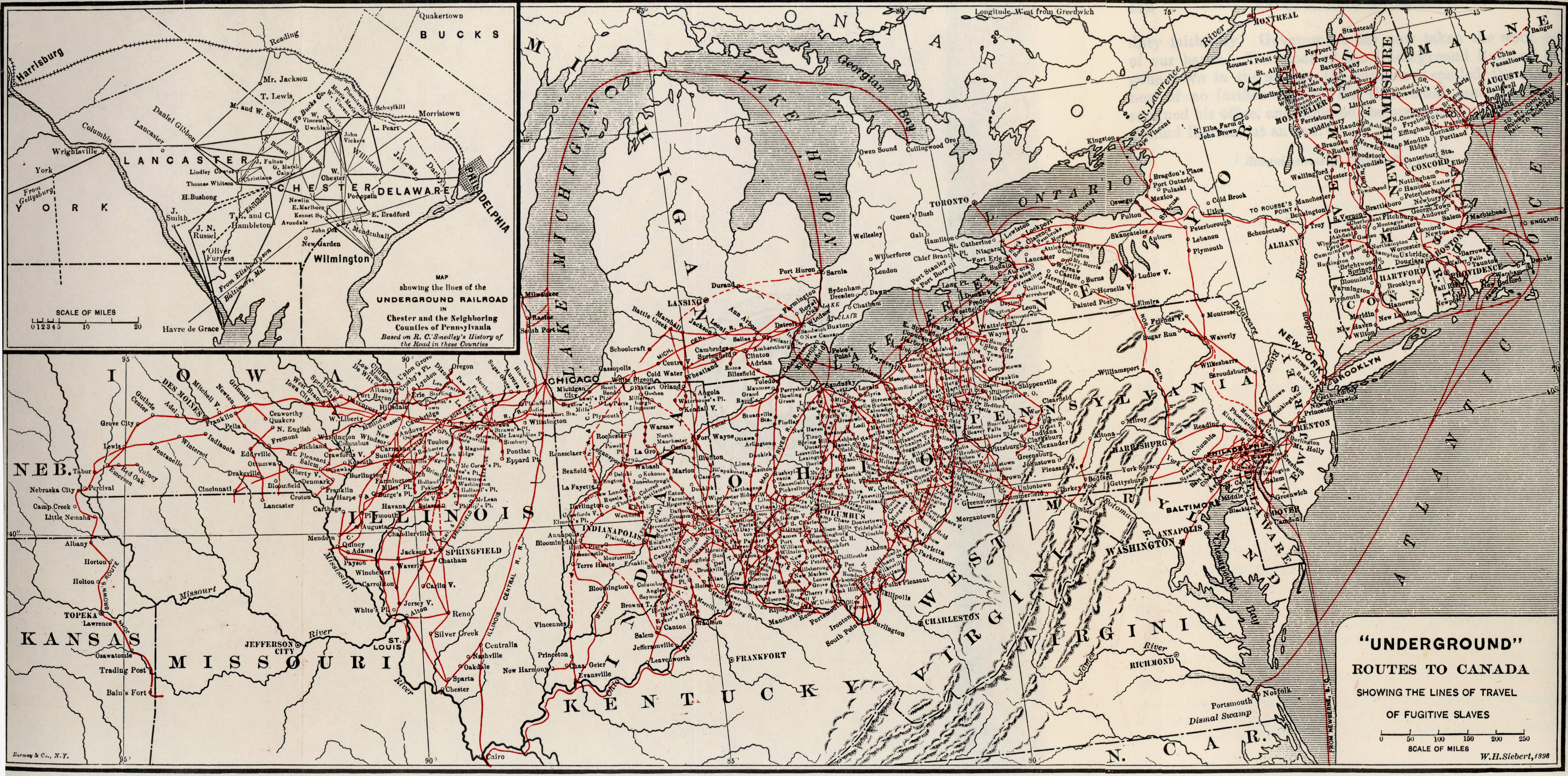
- Map of Underground Railroad routes into the northern United States and to modern-day Canada
- Founding location: United States
- Territory: United States, and routes to British North America, Mexico, Spanish Florida, and the Caribbean
- Ethnicity: African Americans and other compatriots
- Activities: Fleeing from slavery into the northern United States or Canada; Aiding freedom-seeking slaves
- Allies: Religious Society of Friends; Congregational church; Wesleyan Church; Reformed Presbyterian Church of North America; Vigilant Association of Philadelphia
- Rivals: Slave catchers, Reverse Underground Railroad

The Underground Railroad was an organized network of secret routes and safe houses for fugitive slaves to escape to the abolitionist Northern United States and Eastern Canada during the era of slavery in the United States. Slaves escaped from slavery as early as the 16th century; many of their escapes were unaided. However, a network of safe houses generally known as the Underground Railroad began to organize in the 1780s among abolitionist societies in the North. It ran north and grew steadily until President Abraham Lincoln issued the Emancipation Proclamation in 1863. The escapees sought primarily to escape into free states or into Canada.

The Underground Railroad started at the place of enslavement. The routes followed natural and man-made modes of transportation: rivers, canals, bays, the Atlantic Coast, ferries and river crossings, roads and trails. Locations close to ports, free territories, and international boundaries prompted many escapes.

The network, primarily the work of free and enslaved African Americans, was assisted by abolitionists and other individuals sympathetic to the cause of the escapees. The slaves who risked capture and those who aided them were collectively referred to as the passengers and conductors of the Railroad, respectively.

Various other routes led to Mexico, where slavery had been abolished, and to islands in the Caribbean that were not part of the slave trade. An earlier escape route running south toward Florida, then a Spanish possession (except 1763–1783), existed from the late 17th century until approximately 1790.

During the American Civil War, freedom seekers escaped to Union lines in the South to obtain their freedom. One estimate suggests that by 1850, approximately 100,000 slaves had escaped to freedom via the network. According to professor of Pan-African studies J. Blaine Hudson, by the end of the Civil War, 500,000 or more African Americans had self-emancipated from slavery using the Underground Railroad.

== Naming and terminology ==
Enslaved people escape by night to freedom.

While scholars for decades have sought the origin of the term, Scott Shane has documented its very first use in print on August 10, 1842, by Thomas Smallwood, an African American abolitionist in Washington, D.C., in his "Sam Weller" column in the Tocsin of Liberty, an abolitionist newspaper in Albany, New York, edited by his white collaborator, Charles Turner Torrey. Smallwood initially used the term to mock enslavers' astonishment at the numbers of fugitives escaping slavery, and in this first instance, said he was actually quoting the Baltimore constable John Zell, who in exasperation exclaimed that the only way this was possible was if fugitives were traveling by "steam balloon" or "underground rail-road," both new and somewhat fantastical technologies. The joke caught on and was quickly adopted by other abolitionists as a moniker for the entire enterprise.

The best prior claim to its origin was from Eber Pettit's 1879 book Sketches in the History of the Underground Railroad where he "quoted" from memory a 1839 Washington newspaper article that remains otherwise undocumented.

Members of the Underground Railroad often used specific terms, based on the metaphor of the railway. For example:

- People who helped fugitive slaves find the railroad were called "agents".
- Guides were known as "conductors".
- Hiding places were "stations" or "way stations".
- "Station masters" hid escaping slaves in their homes.
- People escaping slavery were referred to as "passengers" or "cargo".
- Fugitive slaves would obtain a "ticket".
- Similar to common gospel lore, the "wheels would keep on turning".
- Financial benefactors of the Railroad were known as "stockholders".
- Promised Land – code word for Canada
- River Jordan – code word for Ohio River
- Heaven – code for freedom or Canada

The Big Dipper (whose "bowl" points to the North Star) was known as the "drinking gourd". The Railroad was often known as the "freedom train" or "Gospel train", which headed towards "Heaven" or "the Promised Land", i.e., Canada.

== Political background ==
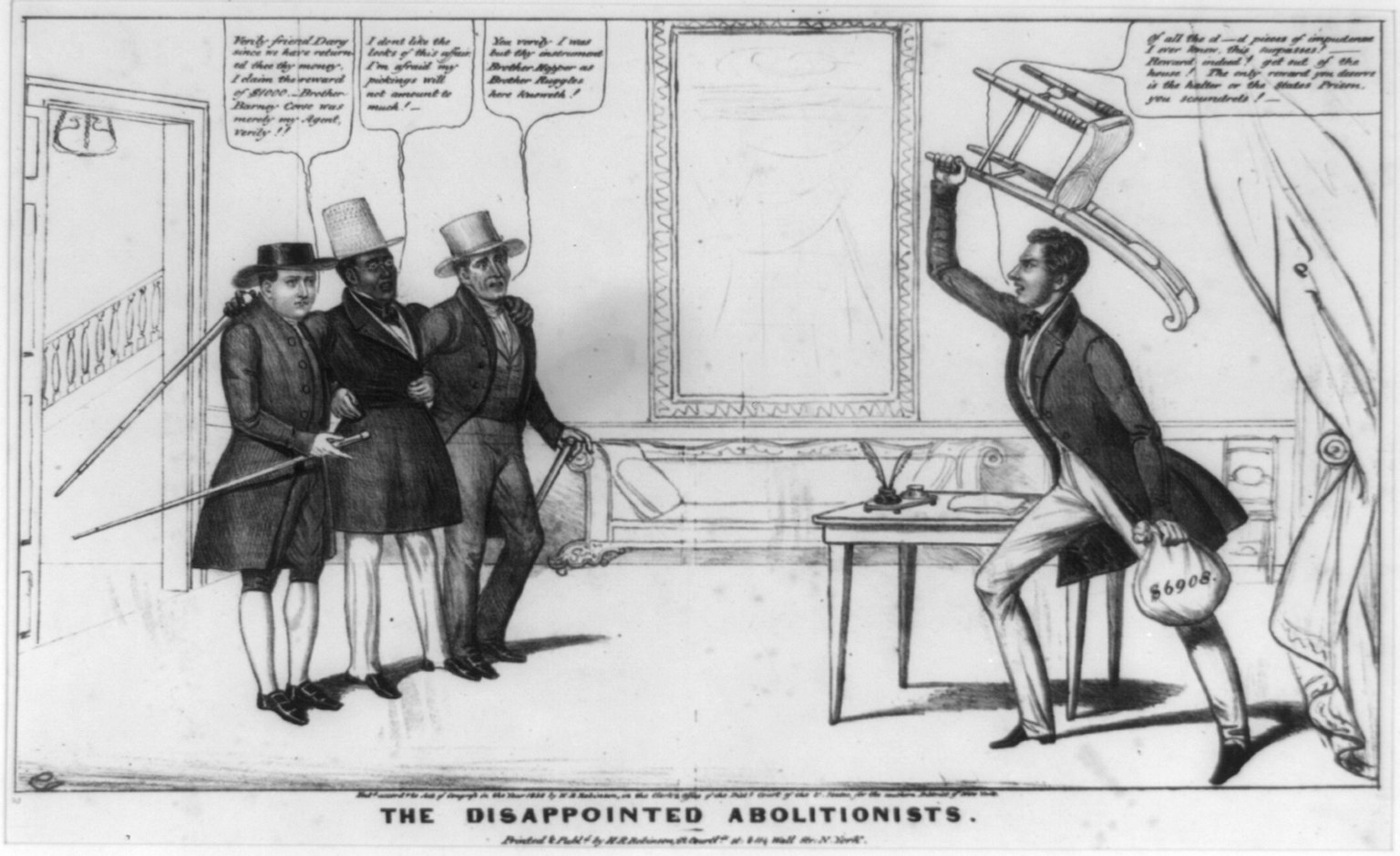
David Ruggles between two men confronting John P. Darg

Many of the fugitive slaves who "rode" the Underground Railroad considered Canada their final destination. An estimated 30,000 to 40,000 of them settled in Canada, half of whom came between 1850 and 1860. Others settled in free states in the north. Thousands of court cases for escaping fugitive slaves were recorded between the Revolutionary War and the Civil War.

Under the original Fugitive Slave Act of 1793, officials from free states were required to assist slaveholders or their agents who recaptured fugitives, but some state legislatures prohibited this. The law made it easier for slaveholders and slave catchers to capture African Americans and return them to slavery, and in some cases allowed them to enslave free blacks. It also created an eagerness among abolitionists to help enslaved people, resulting in the growth of anti-slavery societies and the Underground Railroad.

With heavy lobbying by Southern politicians, the Compromise of 1850 was passed by Congress after the Mexican–American War. It included a more stringent Fugitive Slave Law; ostensibly, the compromise addressed regional problems by compelling officials of free states to assist slave catchers, granting them immunity to operate in free states.

Because the law required sparse documentation to claim a person was a fugitive, slave catchers also kidnapped free blacks, especially children, and sold them into slavery. Southern politicians often exaggerated the number of escaped slaves and often blamed these escapes on Northerners interfering with Southern property rights. The law deprived people suspected of being slaves of the right to defend themselves in court, making it difficult to prove free status.

Some Northern states enacted personal liberty laws that made it illegal for public officials to capture or imprison former slaves. The perception that Northern states ignored the fugitive slave laws and regulations was a major justification offered for secession.

== Routes and methods of escape ==
Map of Underground Railroad routes.

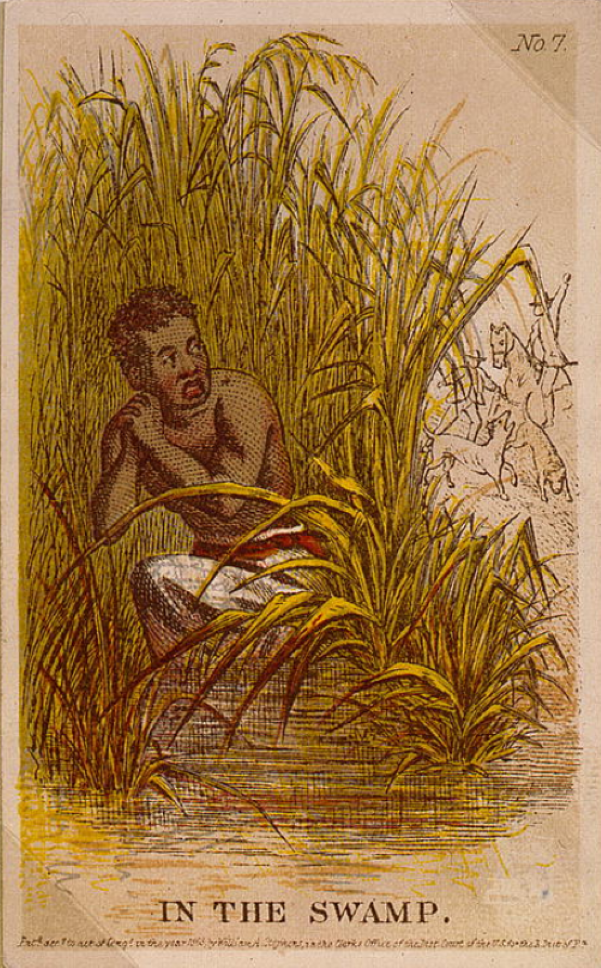
H.L. Stephens' 1863 print (Library of Congress) depicting a freedom seeker in a swamp. Period prints illustrate how freedom seekers used dense wetland terrain for concealment where no local photographs exist.

Underground Railroad routes went north to free states and Canada, to the Caribbean, to United States western territories, and to Indian territories. Some fugitive slaves traveled south into Mexico for their freedom. Many escaped by sea, including Ona Judge, who had been enslaved by President George Washington.

Some historians view the waterways of the South as an important component for freedom seekers to escape as water sources were pathways to freedom. In addition, historians of the Underground Railroad, found 200,000 runaway slave advertisements in North American newspapers from the middle of the 1700s until the end of the American Civil War.

Freedom seekers in Alabama hid on steamboats heading to Mobile, Alabama, in hopes of blending in among the city's free Black community, and also hid on other steamboats leaving Alabama that were headed further northward into free territories and free states. In 1852, a law was passed by the Alabama legislature to reduce the number of freedom seekers escaping on boats. The law penalized slaveholders and captains of vessels if they allowed enslaved people on board without a pass. Alabama freedom seekers also made canoes to escape.

Freedom seekers escaped from their enslavers in Panama on boats heading for California by way of the Panama route. Slaveholders used the Panama route to reach California. In Panama, slavery was illegal and Black Panamanians encouraged enslaved people from the United States to escape into the local city of Panama.

Freedom seekers created methods to throw off the slave catchers' bloodhounds from tracking their scent. One method was using a combination of hot pepper, lard, and vinegar on their shoes. In North Carolina freedom seekers put turpentine on their shoes to prevent slave catchers' dogs from tracking their scents, while in Texas, escapees used paste made from a charred bullfrog. Other runaways escaped into the swamps to wash off their scent. Most escapes occurred at night when the runaways could hide under the cover of darkness.

Another method freedom seekers used to prevent capture was carrying forged free passes. During slavery, free Blacks showed proof of their freedom by carrying a pass that proved they were free. Free Blacks and enslaved people created forged free passes for freedom seekers as they traveled through slave states.

During slavery, wetlands played critical roles in concealing slaves escaping to Canada from southern plantations. The Great Dismal Swamp in North Carolina and Virginia, for example, shielded everyone, including the former slaves who lived there and slaves escaping to Canada. Harriet Tubman worked as a slave her whole life in the marshes and swamps of the Eastern Shore of Maryland, where she learned to use wetlands to gain her freedom, and lead others out of slavery.

== North to free states and Canada ==
=== Structure ===
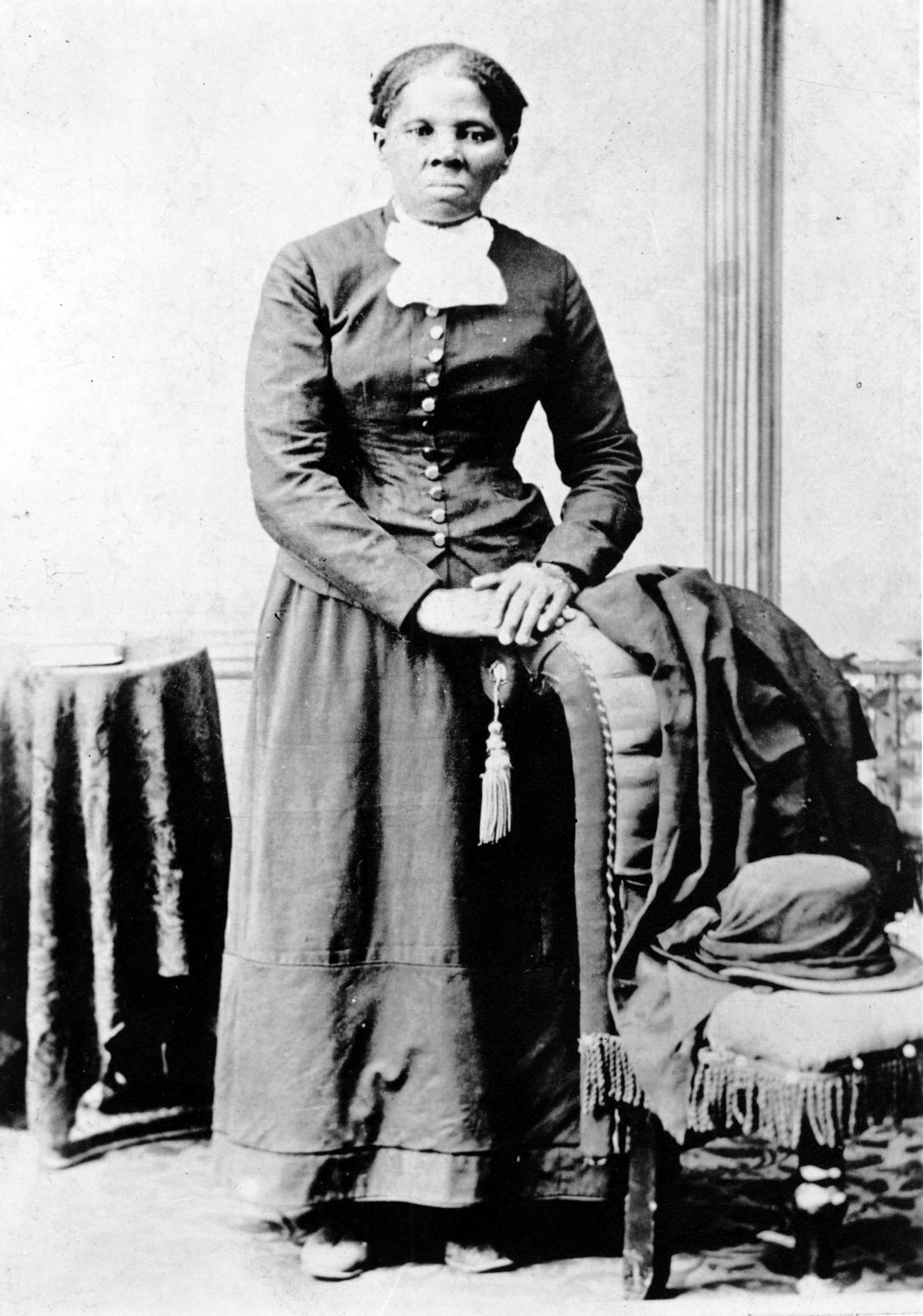
Harriet Tubman (photo H. B. Lindsley), c. 1870. A worker on the Underground Railroad, Tubman made 13 trips to the South, helping to free over 70 people. She led people to the northern free states and Canada. This helped Harriet Tubman gain the name "Moses of Her People".

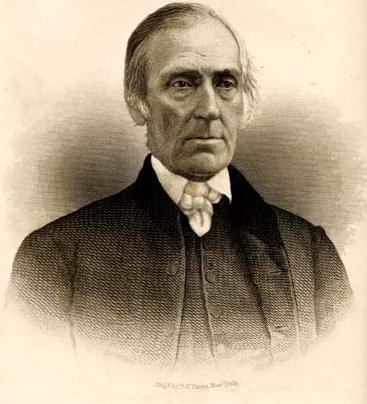
Quaker abolitionist Levi Coffin and his wife Catherine helped more than 2,000 enslaved people escape to freedom.

Despite the thoroughfare's name, the escape network was neither literally underground nor a railroad. According to John Rankin, "It was so called because they who took passage on it disappeared from public view as really as if they had gone into the ground. After the fugitive slaves entered a depot on that road no trace of them could be found. They were secretly passed from one depot to another until they arrived at a destination where they were able to remain free." It was known as a railroad, using rail terminology such as stations and conductors, because that was the transportation system in use at the time.

The Underground Railroad did not have a headquarters or governing body, nor were there published guides, maps, pamphlets, or even newspaper articles. It consisted of meeting points, secret routes, transportation, and safe houses, all of them maintained by abolitionist sympathizers, and communicated by word of mouth, although there is also a report of a numeric code used to encrypt messages.

Participants generally organized in small, independent groups; this helped to maintain secrecy. People escaping enslavement would move north along the route from one way station to the next. "Conductors" on the railroad came from various backgrounds and included free-born blacks, white abolitionists, the formerly enslaved (either escaped or manumitted), and Native Americans.

Believing that slavery was "contrary to the ethics of Jesus", many Christian congregations and clergy played a role, especially the Religious Society of Friends (Quakers), Congregationalists, Wesleyan Methodists, and Reformed Presbyterians, as well as the anti-slavery branches of mainstream denominations which entered into schism over the issue, such as the Methodist Episcopal Church and the Baptists.

The role of free blacks was crucial; without it, there would have been almost no chance for fugitives from slavery to reach freedom safely. The groups of underground railroad "agents" worked in organizations known as vigilance committees.

Free Black communities in Indiana, Illinois, Ohio, Philadelphia, Pennsylvania, and New York helped freedom seekers escape from slavery. Black Churches were stations on the Underground Railroad, and Black communities in the North hid freedom seekers in their churches and homes.

Historian Cheryl Janifer Laroche explained in her book, Free Black Communities and the Underground Railroad The Geography of Resistance that: "Blacks, enslaved and free, operated as the main actors in the central drama that was the Underground Railroad." Laroche further explained how some authors emphasize that white abolitionists and white people involved in the antislavery movement were the main factors for freedom seekers escapes and overlook the important role of free Black communities.

In addition, author Diane Miller states: "Traditionally, historians have overlooked the agency of African Americans in their own quest for freedom by portraying the Underground Railroad as an organized effort by white religious groups, often Quakers, to aid 'helpless' slaves."

Historian Larry Gara argues that many of the stories of the Underground Railroad belonged in folklore and not history. The action of real historical figures such as Harriet Tubman, Thomas Garrett, and Levi Coffin are exaggerated, and Northern abolitionists who guided the enslaved to Canada are hailed as the heroes of the Underground Railroad. This narrative minimizes the intelligence and agency of enslaved Black people who liberated themselves, and implies that freedom seekers needed the help of Northerners to escape.

== Geography ==
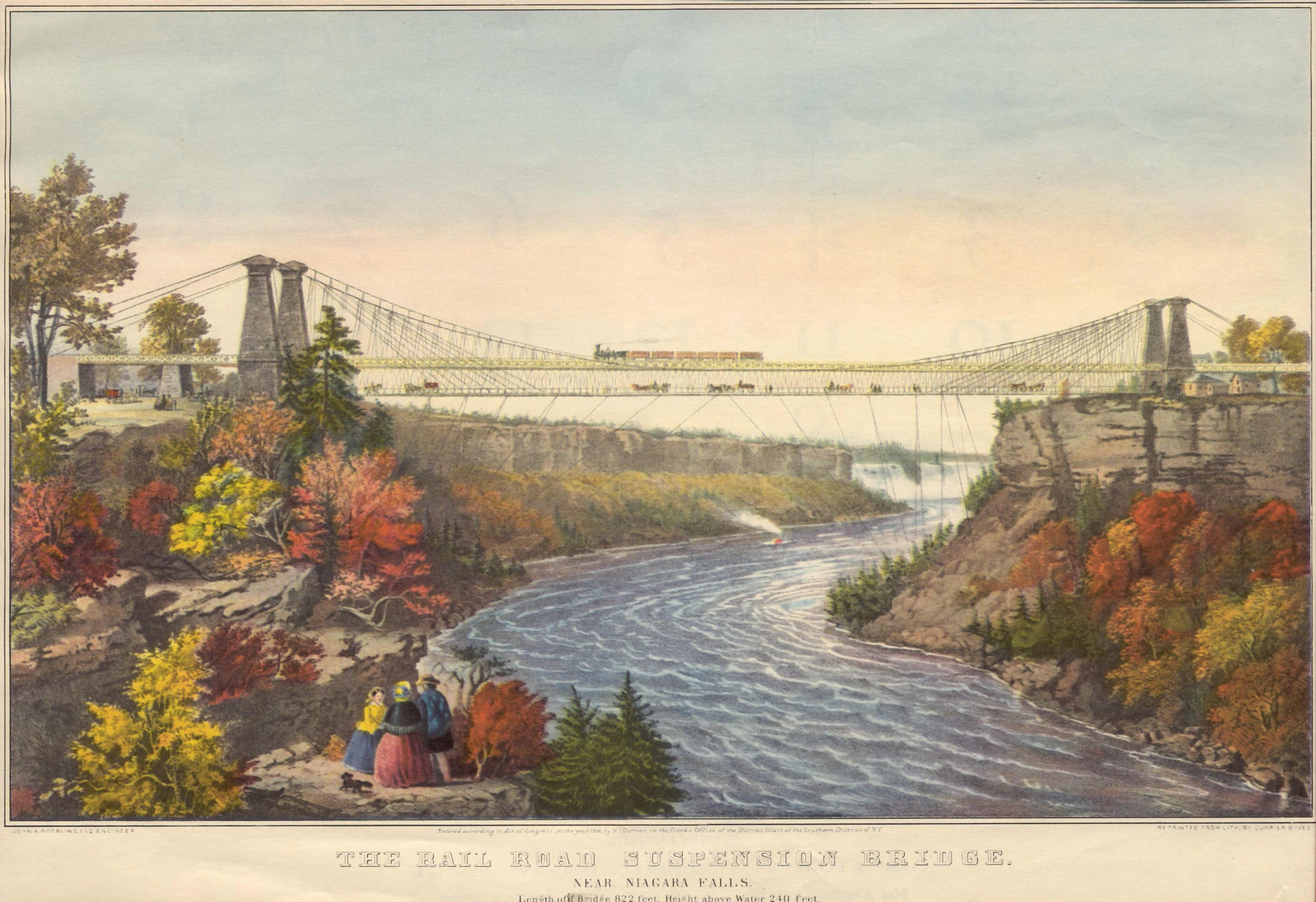
Freedom seekers escaped slavery and reached Canada by way of the Niagara Falls Suspension Bridge.

The Underground Railroad benefited greatly from the geography of the U.S.–Canada border: Michigan, Ohio, Pennsylvania and most of New York were separated from Canada by water, over which transport was usually easy to arrange and relatively safe.

The main route for freedom seekers from the South led up the Appalachians, Harriet Tubman going via Harpers Ferry, through the highly anti-slavery Western Reserve region of northeastern Ohio to the vast shore of Lake Erie, and then to Canada by boat.

A smaller number, traveling by way of New York or New England, went via Syracuse (home of Samuel May) and Rochester, New York (home of Frederick Douglass), crossing the Niagara River or Lake Ontario into Canada. By 1848 the Niagara Falls Suspension Bridge had been built—it crossed the Niagara River and connected New York to Canada. Enslaved runaways used the bridge to escape their bondage, and Harriet Tubman used the bridge to take freedom seekers into Canada.

Those traveling via the New York Adirondacks, sometimes via Black communities like Timbuctoo, New York, entered Canada via Ogdensburg, on the St. Lawrence River, or on Lake Champlain (Joshua Young assisted). The western route, used by John Brown among others, led from Missouri west to free Kansas and north to free Iowa, then east via Chicago to the Detroit River.

Thomas Downing was a free Black man in New York and operated his Oyster restaurant as a stop on the Underground Railroad. Freedom seekers (runaway slaves) escaping slavery and seeking freedom hid in the basement of Downing's restaurant. Enslaved people helped freedom seekers escape from slavery. Arnold Gragstone was enslaved and helped runaways escape from slavery by guiding them across the Ohio River for their freedom.

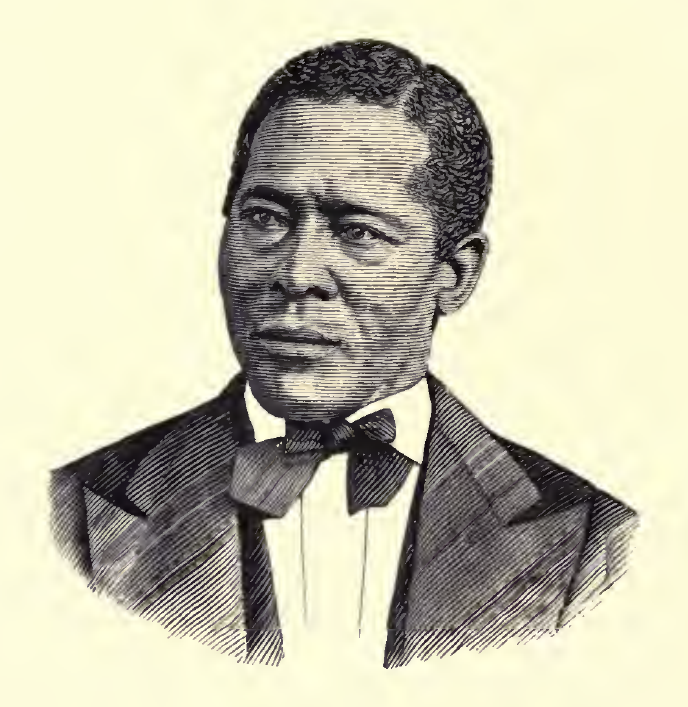
William Still was a free Black man in Philadelphia who helped hundreds of freedom seekers escape from slavery.

William Still, sometimes called "The Father of the Underground Railroad", helped hundreds of slaves escape (as many as 60 a month), sometimes hiding them in his Philadelphia home. He kept careful records, including short biographies of the people, that contained frequent railway metaphors.

He maintained correspondence with many of them, often acting as a middleman in communications between people who had escaped slavery and those left behind. He later published these accounts in the book The Underground Railroad: Authentic Narratives and First-Hand Accounts (1872), a valuable resource for historians to understand how the system worked and learn about individual ingenuity in escapes.

According to Still, messages were often encoded so that they could be understood only by those active in the railroad. For example, the following message, "I have sent via at two o'clock four large hams and two small hams", indicated that four adults and two children were sent by train from Harrisburg to Philadelphia. The additional word via indicated that the "passengers" were not sent on the usual train, but rather via Reading, Pennsylvania. In this case, the authorities were tricked into going to the regular location (station) in an attempt to intercept the runaways, while Still met them at the correct station and guided them to safety. They eventually escaped either further north or to Canada, where slavery had been abolished during the 1830s.

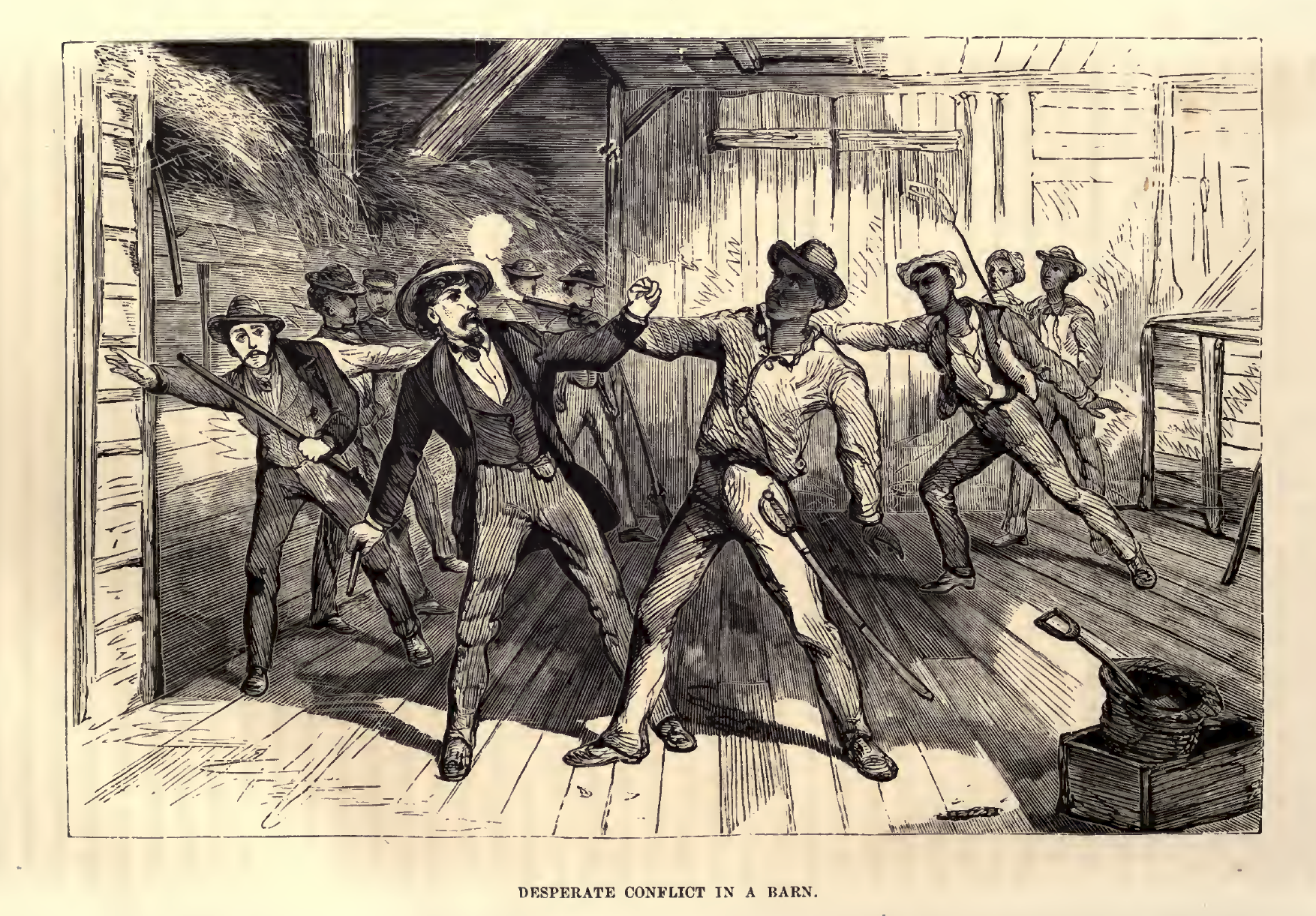
Struggle for freedom in a Maryland barn. Wood-engraving from William Still's The Underground Rail Road, p. 50.

To reduce the risk of infiltration, many people associated with the Underground Railroad knew only their part of the operation and not of the whole scheme. "Conductors" led or transported the "passengers" from station to station. A conductor sometimes pretended to be enslaved to enter a plantation. Once a part of a plantation, the conductor would direct the runaways to the North.

Enslaved people traveled at night, about 10–20 miles (16–32 km) to each station. They rested, and then a message was sent to the next station to let the station master know the escapees were on their way. They would stop at the so-called "stations" or "depots" during the day and rest. The stations were often located in basements, barns, churches, or in hiding places in caves.

The resting spots where the freedom seekers could sleep and eat were given the code names "stations" and "depots", which were held by "station masters". "Stockholders" gave money or supplies for assistance. Using biblical references, fugitives referred to Canada as the "Promised Land" or "Heaven" and the Ohio River, which marked the boundary between slave states and free states, as the "River Jordan".

== Traveling conditions ==
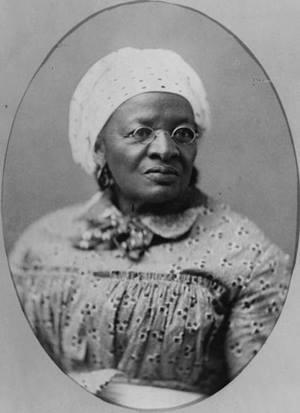
Mary Meachum was an Underground Railroad agent in St. Louis, Missouri

Although the freedom seekers sometimes traveled on boat or train, they usually traveled on foot or by wagon, sometimes lying down, covered with hay or similar products, in groups of one to three escapees. Some groups were considerably larger.

Abolitionist Charles Turner Torrey and his colleagues rented horses and wagons and often transported as many as 15 or 20 people at a time. Free and enslaved black men occupied as mariners (sailors) helped enslaved people escape from slavery by providing a ride on their ship, providing information on the safest and best escape routes, and safe locations on land, and locations of trusted people for assistance.

Enslaved African-American mariners had information about slave revolts occurring in the Caribbean, and relayed this news to enslaved people they had contact with in American ports. Free and enslaved African-American mariners assisted Harriet Tubman in her rescue missions. Black mariners provided to her information about the best escape routes and helped her on her rescue missions. In New Bedford, Massachusetts, freedom seekers stowed away on ships leaving the docks with the assistance of Black and white crewmembers and hid in the ships' cargoes during their journey to freedom.

Enslaved people living near rivers escaped on boats and canoes. In 1855, Mary Meachum, a free Black woman, attempted to help eight or nine slaves escape from slavery on the Mississippi River near St. Louis, Missouri to the free state of Illinois. Assisting with the escape were white antislavery activists and an African American guide from Illinois named "Freeman." However, the escape was not successful because word of the escape reached police agents and slave catchers who waited across the river on the Illinois shore. Breckenridge, Burrows and Meachum were arrested. Prior to this escape attempt, Mary Meachum and her husband John, a former slave, were agents on the Underground Railroad and helped other slaves escape from slavery crossing the Mississippi River.

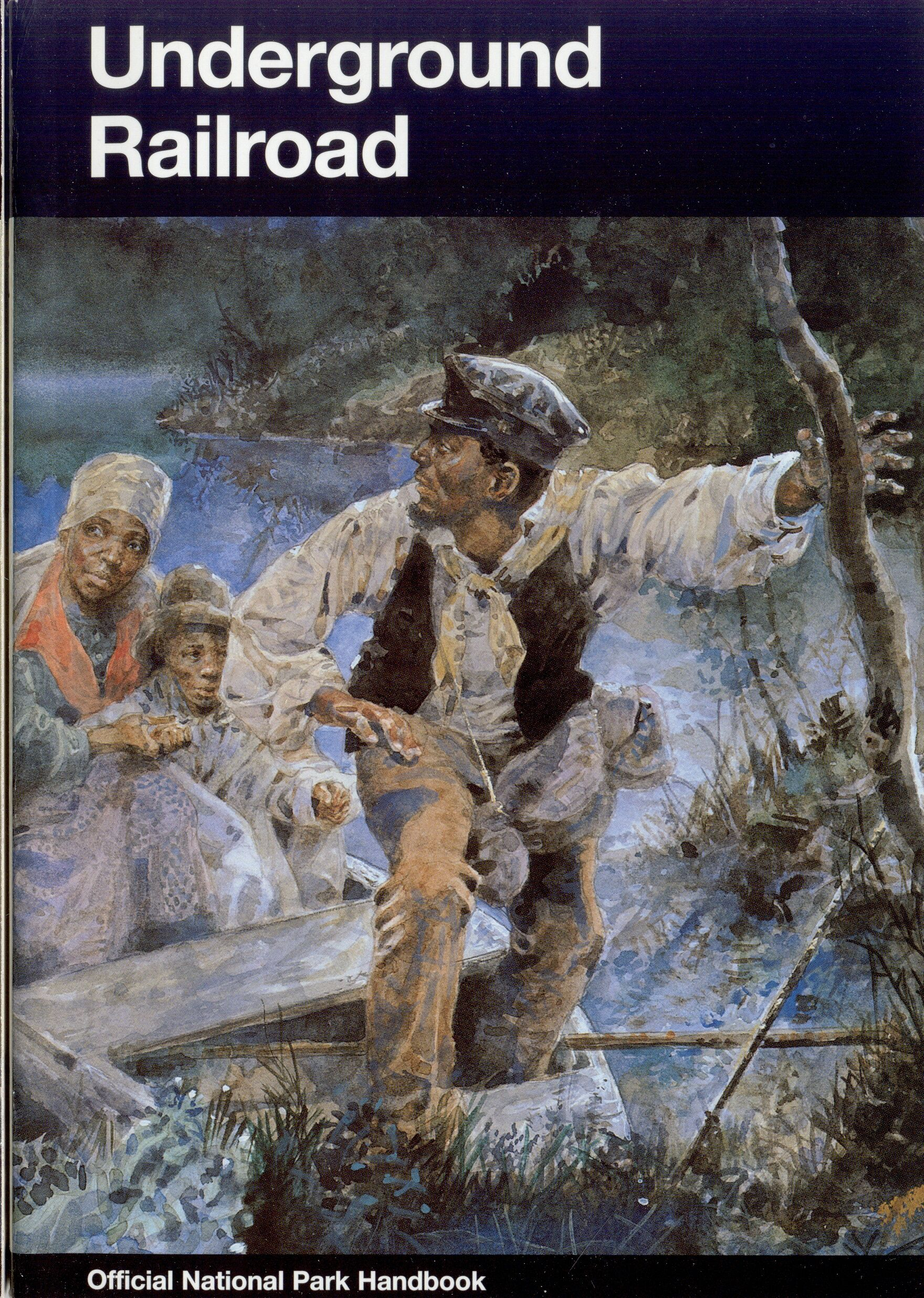
Enslaved people living near rivers and the Chesapeake Bay escaped from slavery using canoes and boats.

Routes were often purposely indirect to confuse pursuers. Most escapes were by individuals or small groups; occasionally, there were mass escapes, such as the Pearl incident. The journey was often considered particularly difficult and dangerous for women or children. Children were sometimes hard to keep quiet or were unable to keep up with a group. In addition, enslaved women were rarely allowed to leave the plantation, making it harder for them to escape in the same ways that men could.

Although escaping was harder for women, some women were successful. One of the most famous and successful conductors (people who secretly traveled into slave states to rescue those seeking freedom) was Harriet Tubman, a woman who escaped slavery.

Due to the risk of discovery, information about routes and safe havens was passed along by word of mouth, although in 1896 there is a reference to a numerical code used to encrypt messages.

Southern newspapers of the day were often filled with pages of notices soliciting information about fugitive slaves and offering sizable rewards for their capture and return. Federal marshals and professional bounty hunters known as slave catchers pursued freedom seekers as far as the Canada–U.S. border.

Freedom seekers (runaway slaves) foraged, fished, and hunted for food on their journey to freedom on the Underground Railroad. With these ingredients, they prepared one-pot meals (stews), a West African cooking method. Enslaved and free Black people left food outside their front doors to provide nourishment to the freedom seekers. The meals created on the Underground Railroad became a part of the foodways of Black Americans called soul food.

== Maroons ==
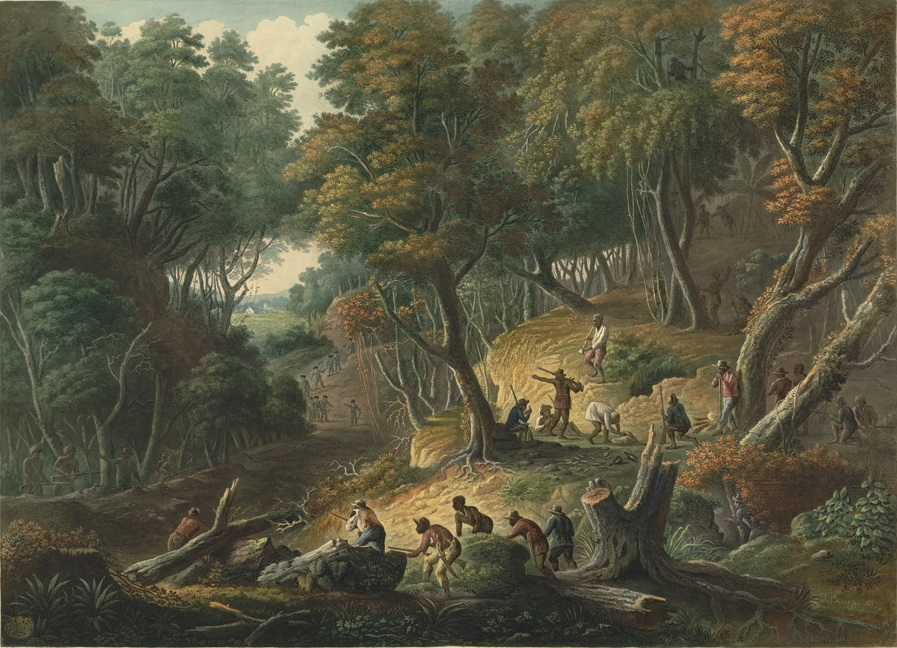
Maroons

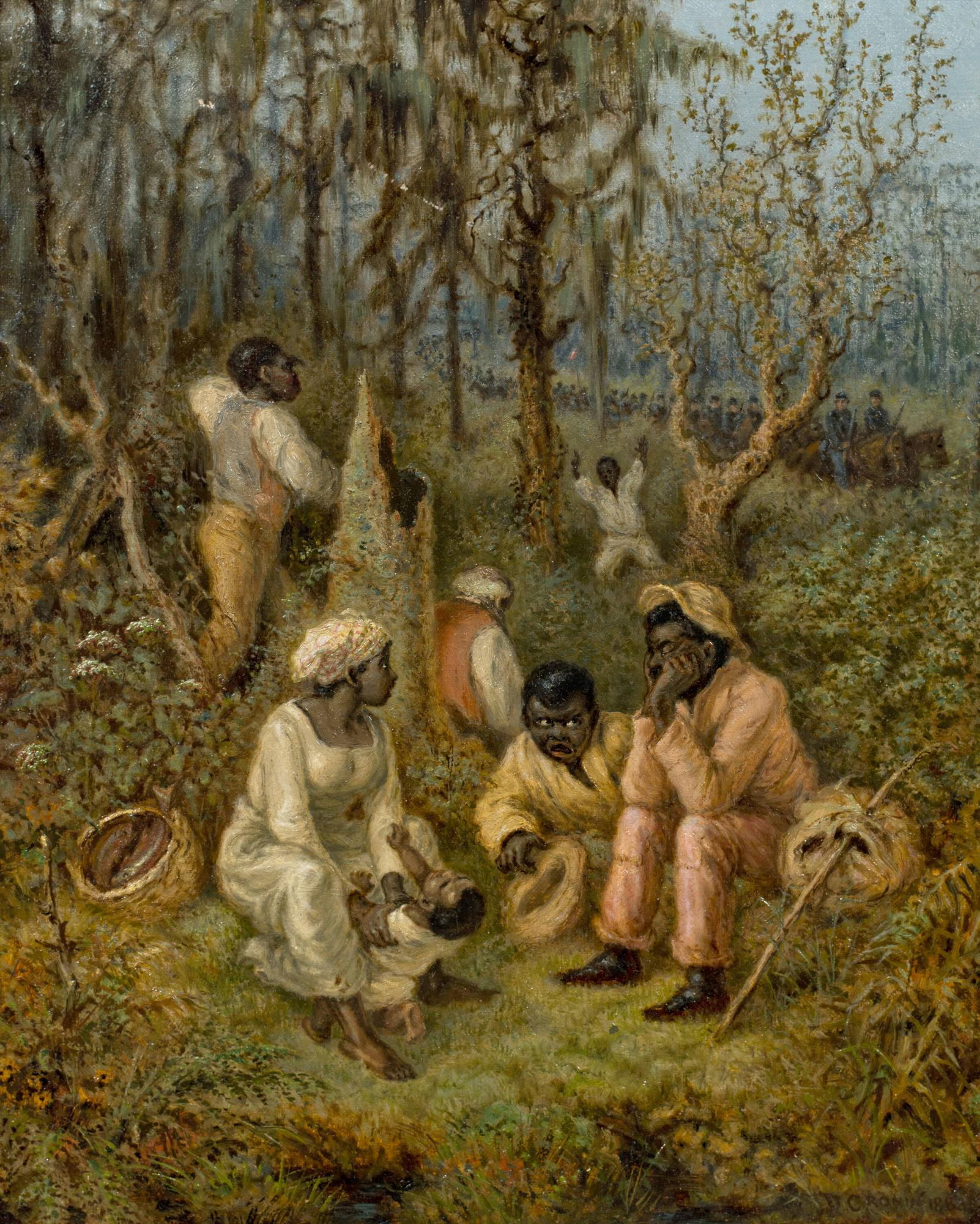
Freedom seekers escaped to the Great Dismal Swamp's maroon community.

Although there are stories of black and white abolitionists helping freedom seekers escape from slavery, the majority of the escapes from slavery did not have help from an abolitionist.

Other Underground Railroad escape routes for freedom seekers were maroon communities. Maroon communities were hidden places, such as wetlands or marshes, where escaped slaves established their own independent communities. Examples of maroon communities in the United States include the Black Seminole communities in Florida, as well as groups that lived in the Great Dismal Swamp in Virginia and in the Okefenokee swamp of Georgia and Florida, among others.

In the 1780s, Louisiana had a maroon community in the bayous of Saint Malo. The leader of the Saint Malo maroon community was Jean Saint Malo, a freedom seeker who escaped to live among other runaways in the swamps and bayous of Saint Malo. The population of maroons was fifty and the Spanish colonial government broke up the community and on June 19, 1784, Jean Saint Malo was executed. Colonial South Carolina had a number of maroon settlements in its marshland regions in the Lowcountry and near rivers. Maroons in South Carolina fought to maintain their freedom and prevent enslavement in Ashepoo in 1816, Williamsburg County in 1819, Georgetown in 1820, Jacksonborough in 1822, and near Marion in 1861.

Historian Herbert Aptheker found evidence that fifty maroon communities existed in the United States between 1672 and 1864. The history of maroons showed how the enslaved resisted enslavement by living in free independent settlements. Historical archeologist Dan Sayer says that historians downplay the importance of maroon settlements and place valor in white involvement in the Underground Railroad, which he argues shows a racial bias, indicating a "...reluctance to acknowledge the strength of black resistance and initiative."

== Freedom routes into Native American lands ==
From colonial America into the 19th century, Indigenous peoples of North America assisted and protected enslaved Africans journey to freedom. However, not all Indigenous communities were accepting of freedom seekers, some of whom they enslaved themselves or returned to their former enslavers.

The earliest accounts of escape are from the 16th century. In 1526, Spaniards established the first European colony in the continental United States in South Carolina called San Miguel de Gualdape. The enslaved Africans revolted and historians suggest they escaped to Shakori Indigenous communities.

As early as 1689, enslaved Africans fled from the South Carolina Lowcountry to Spanish Florida seeking freedom. The Seminole Nation accepted Gullah runaways (today called Black Seminoles) into their lands. This was a southern route on the Underground Railroad into Seminole Indian lands that went from Georgia and the Carolinas into Florida. In Northwest Ohio in the 18th and 19th centuries, three Indigenous/Native American nations, the Shawnee, Ottawa, and Wyandot assisted freedom seekers escape from slavery. The Ottawa people accepted and protected runaways in their villages. Other escapees were taken to Fort Malden by the Ottawa. In Upper Sandusky, Wyandot people allowed a maroon community of freedom seekers in their lands called Negro Town for four decades.

In the 18th and 19th centuries in areas around the Chesapeake Bay and Delaware, Nanticoke people hid freedom seekers in their villages. The Nanticoke people lived in small villages near the Pocomoke River; the river rises in several forks in the Great Cypress Swamp in southern Sussex County, Delaware. African Americans escaping slavery were able to hide in swamps, and the water washed off the scent of enslaved runaways, making it difficult for dogs to track their scent.

As early as the 18th century, mixed-blood communities formed. In Maryland, freedom seekers escaped to Shawnee villages located along the Potomac River. Slaveholders in Virginia and Maryland filed numerous complaints and court petitions against the Shawnee and Nanticoke for hiding freedom seekers in their villages. Odawa people also accepted freedom seekers into their villages. The Odawa transferred the runaways to the Ojibwe who escorted them to Canada. Some enslaved people who escaped slavery and fled to Native American villages stayed in their communities. White pioneers who traveled to Kentucky and the Ohio Territory saw "Black Shawnees" living with Indigenous people in the trans-Appalachian west. During the colonial era in New Spain and in the Seminole Nation in Florida, African Americans and Indigenous marriages occurred.

== South to Florida and Mexico ==
=== Background ===
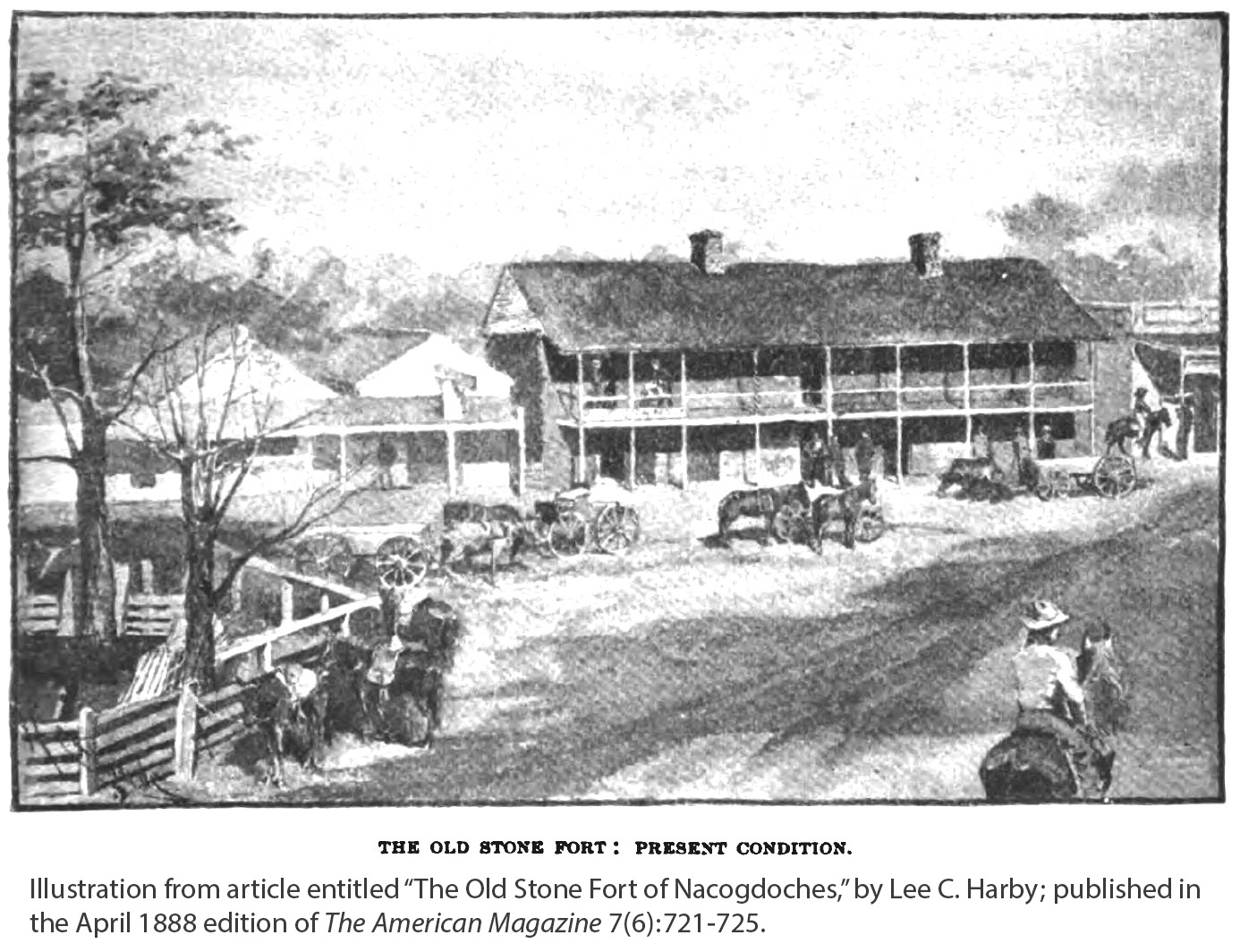
"The Old Stone Fort of Nacogdoches", by Lee C. Harby, The American Magazine, April 1888 edition

Beginning in the 16th century, Spaniards brought enslaved Africans to New Spain, including Mission Nombre de Dios in what would become the city of St. Augustine in Spanish Florida. Over time, free Afro-Spaniards took up various trades and occupations and served in the colonial militia. After King Charles II of Spain proclaimed Spanish Florida a safe haven for escaped slaves from British North America, they began escaping to Florida by the hundreds from as far north as New York. The Spanish established Fort Mose for free Blacks in the St. Augustine area in 1738.

In 1806, enslaved people arrived at the Stone Fort in Nacogdoches, Texas seeking freedom. They arrived with a forged passport from a Kentucky judge. The Spanish refused to return them back to the United States. More freedom seekers traveled through Texas the following year.

Enslaved people were emancipated by crossing the border from the United States into Mexico, which was a Spanish colony into the nineteenth century. In the United States, enslaved people were considered property. That meant that they did not have rights to marry and they could be sold away from their partners. They also did not have rights to fight inhumane and cruel punishment. In New Spain, fugitive slaves were recognized as humans. They were allowed to join the Catholic Church and marry. They also were protected from inhumane and cruel punishment.

During the War of 1812, U.S. Army general Andrew Jackson invaded Spanish Florida in part because enslaved people had run away from plantations in the Carolinas and Georgia to Florida. Some of the runaways joined the Black Seminoles who later moved to Mexico. However, Mexico sent mixed signals on its position against slavery. Sometimes it allowed enslaved people to be returned to slavery and it allowed Americans to move into Spanish territorial property in order to populate the North, where the Americans would then establish cotton plantations, bringing enslaved people to work the land.

In 1829, Mexican president Vicente Guerrero (who was a mixed race black man) formally abolished slavery in Mexico. Freedom seekers from Southern plantations in the Deep South, particularly from Louisiana, Mississippi and Texas, escaped slavery and headed for Mexico. At that time, Texas was part of Mexico. The Texas Revolution, initiated in part to legalize slavery, resulted in the formation of the Republic of Texas in 1836. Following the Battle of San Jacinto, there were some enslaved people who withdrew from the Houston area with the Mexican army, seeing the troops as a means to escape slavery. When Texas joined the Union in 1845, it was a slave state and the Rio Grande became the international border with Mexico.

Pressure between free and slave states deepened as Mexico abolished slavery and western states joined the Union as free states. As more free states were added to the Union, the lesser the influence of slave state representatives in Congress.

=== Slave states and slave hunters ===
The Southern Underground Railroad went through slave states, lacking the abolitionist societies and the organized system of the north. People who spoke out against slavery were subject to mobs, physical assault, and being hanged. There were slave catchers who looked for runaway slaves. There were never more than a few hundred free blacks in Texas, which meant that free blacks did not feel safe in the state. The network to freedom was informal, random, and dangerous.

U.S. military forts, established along the Rio Grande border during the Mexican–American War of the 1840s, captured and returned fleeing enslaved people to their slaveholders.

The Fugitive Slave Act of 1850 made it a criminal offense to aid fleeing enslaved people in free states. Similarly, the United States government wanted to enact a treaty with Mexico to facilitate the capture and return of escaped slaves in that country. Mexico, however, continued its practice of allowing any slave who crossed its border to be free. Slave catchers, though, continued to cross the southern border into Mexico and illegally capture black people and return them to slavery. A group of slave hunters became the Texas Rangers.

== Routes ==
Routes from Indian Territory (Oklahoma), Arkansas, and Louisiana through Texas: 1) Dallas or Nacogdoches to Austin – San Antonio – Laredo, 2) Nacogdoches to Houston – Galveston – boat to Mexico, 3) Nacogdoches to Houston – Matamoros

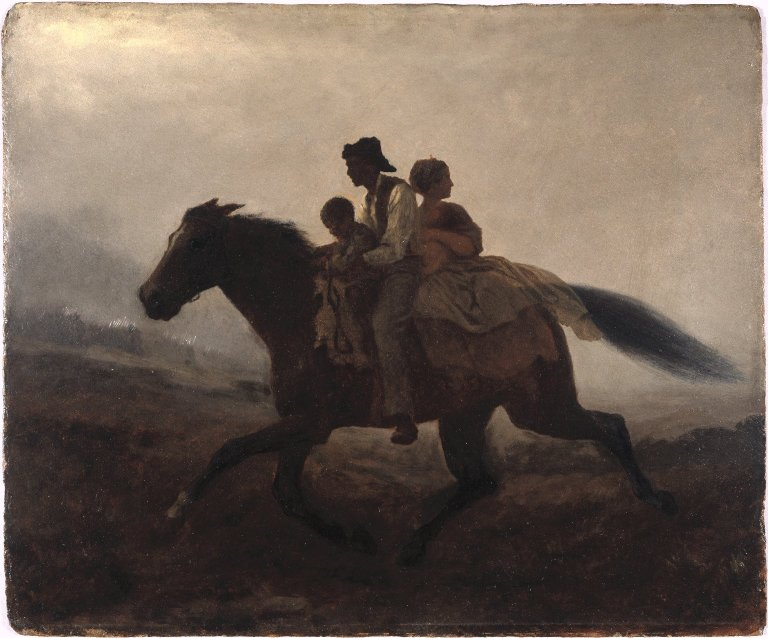
Eastman Johnson, A Ride for Liberty – The Fugitive Slaves, oil on paperboard, 22 × 26.25 inches, c. 1862, Brooklyn Museum. Depicts a family of African Americans fleeing enslavement in the Southern United States during the American Civil War.

Thousands of freedom seekers traveled along a network from the southern United States to Texas and ultimately Mexico. Southern enslaved people generally traveled across "unforgiving country" on foot or horseback while pursued by lawmen and slave hunters. Some stowed away on ferries bound for a Mexican port from New Orleans, Louisiana and Galveston, Texas. There were some who transported cotton to Brownsville, Texas on wagons and then crossed into Mexico at Matamoros.

Sometimes someone would come 'long and try to get us to run up north and be free. We used to laugh at that.

— Former slave Felix Haywood, interviewed in 1937 for the federal Slave Narrative Project

Many traveled through North Carolina, Arkansas, Alabama, Louisiana, or Mississippi toward Texas and ultimately Mexico. People fled slavery from Indian Territory (now Oklahoma). Black Seminoles traveled on a southwestern route from Florida into Mexico.

Going overland meant that the last 150 miles or so were traversed through the difficult and extremely hot terrain of the Nueces Strip located between the Nueces River and the Rio Grande. There was little shade and a lack of potable water in this brush country. (Note: Of recent years, unauthorized migrants have died when crossing this area, evidenced by bones found by immigration agents.) Escapees were more likely to survive the trip if they had a horse and a gun.

The National Park Service identified a route from Natchitoches, Louisiana to Monclova, Mexico in 2010 that is roughly the southern Underground Railroad path. It is also believed that El Camino Real de los Tejas was a path for freedom. It was made a National Historic Trail by President George W. Bush in 2004.

== Assistance ==
Some journeyed on their own without assistance, and others were helped by people along the southern Underground Railroad. Assistance included guidance, directions, shelter, and supplies.

Black people, black and white couples, and anti-slavery German immigrants provided support, but most of the help came from Mexican laborers. So much so that enslavers came to distrust any Mexican, and a law was enacted in Texas that forbade Mexicans from talking to enslaved people. Mexican migrant workers developed relationships with enslaved black workers whom they worked with. They offered guidance, such as what it would be like to cross the border, and empathy. Having realized the ways in which Mexicans were helping enslaved people to escape, slaveholders and residents of Texan towns pushed people out of the town, whipped them in public, or lynched them.

Some border officials helped enslaved people crossing into Mexico. In Monclova, Mexico a border official took up a collection in the town for a family in need of food, clothing, and money to continue on their journey south and out of reach of slave hunters. Once they crossed the border, some Mexican authorities helped former enslaved people from being returned to the United States by slave hunters.

Freedom seekers that were taken on ferries to Mexican ports were aided by Mexican ship captains, one of whom was caught in Louisiana and indicted for helping enslaved people escape.

Knowing the repercussions of running away or being caught helping someone runaway, people were careful to cover their tracks, and public and personal records about fugitive slaves are scarce. In greater supply are records by people who promoted slavery or attempted to catch fugitive slaves. More than 2,500 escapes are documented by the Texas Runaway Slave Project at Stephen F. Austin State University.

== Southern freedom seekers ==
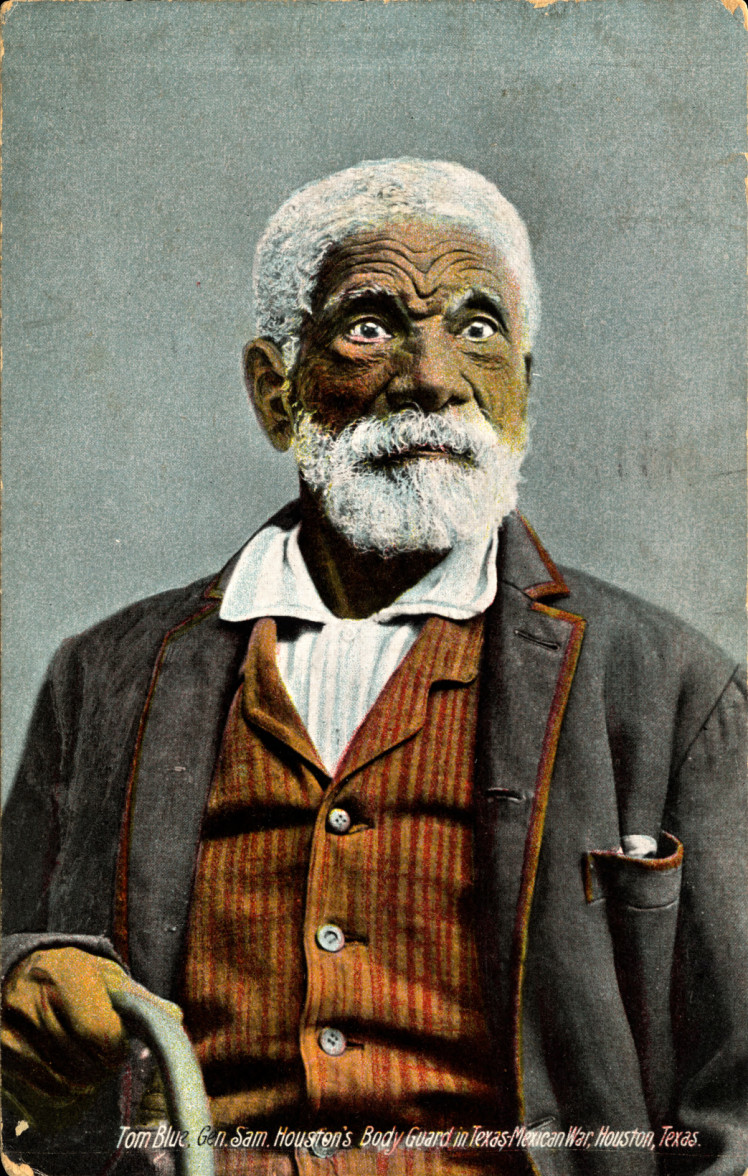
Tom Blue, enslaved by General Sam Houston, ran away and joined the Mexican military.

Advertisements were placed in newspapers offering rewards for the return of their "property". Slave catchers traveled through Mexico. There were Black Seminoles, or Los Mascogos who lived in northern Mexico who provided armed resistance.

Sam Houston, president of the Republic of Texas, was the slaveholder to Tom who ran away. He headed to Texas and once there he enlisted in the Mexican military.

One enslaved man was branded with the letter "R" on each side of his cheek after a failed attempt to escape slavery. He tried again in the winter of 1819, leaving the cotton plantation of his enslaver on horseback. With four others, they traveled southwest to Mexico at the risk of being attacked by hostile Native Americans, apprehended by slave catchers, or attacked by "horse-eating alligators".

Many people did not make it to Mexico. In 1842, a Mexican man and a black woman left Jackson County, Texas on two horses, but they were caught at the Lavaca River. The wife, an enslaved woman, was valuable to her owner so she was returned to slavery. Her husband, possibly a farm laborer or an indentured servant, was immediately lynched.

Fugitive slaves changed their names in Mexico. They married into Mexican families and relocated further south of the American-Mexican border. All of these factors makes it hard to trace the whereabouts of the formerly enslaved people. A database at Stephen F. Austin State University has a record of runaway slave advertisements as part of The Texas Runaway Slave Project. The Works Progress Administration during the Great Depression initiated a Federal Writers' Project to document slave narratives, including those who settled in Mexico. One of them was Felix Haywood, who found freedom when he crossed the Rio Grande.

== Rio Grande stations ==
Two families, the Webbers and the Jacksons, lived along the Rio Grande and helped people escape slavery. The husbands were white and the wives were black women who had been formerly enslaved. It is not known if Nathaniel Jackson purchased the freedom of Matilda Hicks and her family, but in the early 1860s they moved to Hidalgo county, where they settled and lived as a family. He was a white southerner and she was an enslaved woman, who had been childhood sweethearts in Alabama. He was the son of her slaveholder, who helped a group of seven families in 1857 and others cross into Mexico.

Silvia Hector Webber was born enslaved in West Florida and in 1819 was sold to a slaveholder in Clark County, Arkansas. The slaveholders' son, John Cryer, illegally brought Silvia to Mexican Texas in 1828, four years after Mexico had deemed the slave trade into Mexican territory against the law. Silvia, however, with the help of John Webber secured her and her 3 children's freedom papers in 1834. Together Silvia and John lived an antislavery life and often harbored fugitives from slavery in their ranch and house. Silvia was known to transport freedom seekers, on a ferry she licensed at her ranch, onto freedom in Mexico.

John Ferdinand Webber, born in Vermont, lived along the Rio Grande with his wife, Silvia Hector Webber, and together were known to have helped enslaved people cross the Rio Grande. The Jacksons and Webbers, who both owned licensed ferry service, were well known among runaways.

== Arrival in Mexico ==
Black freedom seekers arrived in Mexico with uncertain fates due to Mexican immigration policy. The law required that all persons entering the country and seeking to settle obtain a visa. Formerly enslaved Africans could not get a visa because the application required documentation from the country of origin. Although the visa policy did create barriers in obtaining a legal stay and increased the chances of recapture from slave catchers up until 1857, when it was eliminated, becoming members of civic society, such as joining the Mexican military, becoming godparents to Mexican children, and marrying into families, offered a unique citizenship status that the Mexican government recognized.

Mexican people also helped formerly enslaved Africans by offering them "hospitality" into Mexico and protecting them from recapture. In one of many instances, Mexican officials and civilians in Piedras Negras, Mexico, rejected fugitive slave laws and "expelled" American slave catchers who attempted to recapture freed Africans. When formerly enslaved Africans could be deported or recaptured, Mexican people would rally behind them and advocate for their legal stay. In most cases, formerly enslaved Africans were recognized as citizens by the Mexican government, which allowed them to remain in Mexico at most.

== Colonies ==
There were abolitionists from the north who petitioned the Mexican government to establish colonies for free and runaway blacks. Benjamin Lundy, a Quaker, lobbied for a colony to be established in what is now Texas during the early 1830s, but he was unable to do so when Texas legalized slavery when it separated from Mexico and became the Republic of Texas (1836). Black Seminoles successfully petitioned for land and established a colony in 1852. The land is still owned by their descendants.

=== Scholarship ===
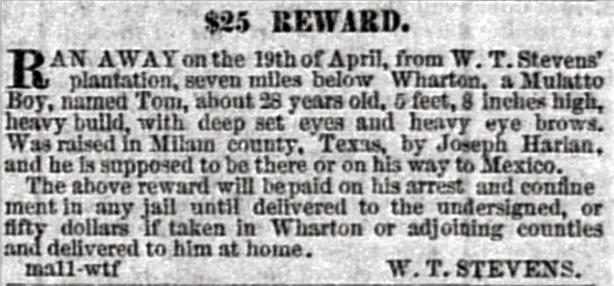
$25 reward for Tom, Galveston Weekly News from May 11, 1858

The Texas Runaway Slave Project, located in Nacogdoches at the Stephen F. Austin State University, has researched runaway advertisements that appeared in 19,000 editions of newspapers from the mid-19th century.

Alice L. Baumgartner has studied the prevalence of people who fled slavery from the Southern states to Mexico. She published South to Freedom: Runaway Slaves to Mexico and the Road to the Civil War. Thomas Mareite completed a doctoral dissertation at Leiden University on the social and political experiences of enslaved people who escaped from the U.S. South to Mexico, titled Conditional Freedom: Free Soil and Fugitive Slaves from the U.S. South to Mexico's Northeast, 1803–1861. Roseann Bacha-Garza, of the University of Texas Rio Grande Valley, has managed historical archeology projects and has researched the incidence of enslaved people who fled to Mexico. Mekala Audain has also published a chapter titled "A Scheme to Desert: The Louisiana Purchase and Freedom Seekers in the Louisiana-Texas Borderlands, 1804–1806" in the edited volume In Search of Liberty: African American Internationalism in the Nineteenth-Century Atlantic World. Maria Esther Hammack completed her doctoral dissertation on the subject in 2021 at the University of Texas at Austin.

== "Reverse Underground Railroad" ==
Freedom seekers were not the only black people at risk from slave catchers. With demand for slaves high in the Deep South as cotton was planted, strong, healthy blacks in their prime working and reproductive years were seen and treated as highly valuable commodities. Both former slaves and free blacks were sometimes kidnapped and sold into slavery, as in the well-documented case of Solomon Northup, a New York-born free black who was kidnapped by Southern slavers while visiting Washington, DC. "Certificates of freedom", also known as "free papers", were signed and notarized statements attesting to the free status of individual Blacks. They could easily be destroyed or stolen, so they provided little protection.

Some buildings, such as the Crenshaw House in far-southeastern Illinois, are known sites where free blacks were sold into slavery, known as the "Reverse Underground Railroad".

== American Revolutionary War routes (1775 to 1783) ==
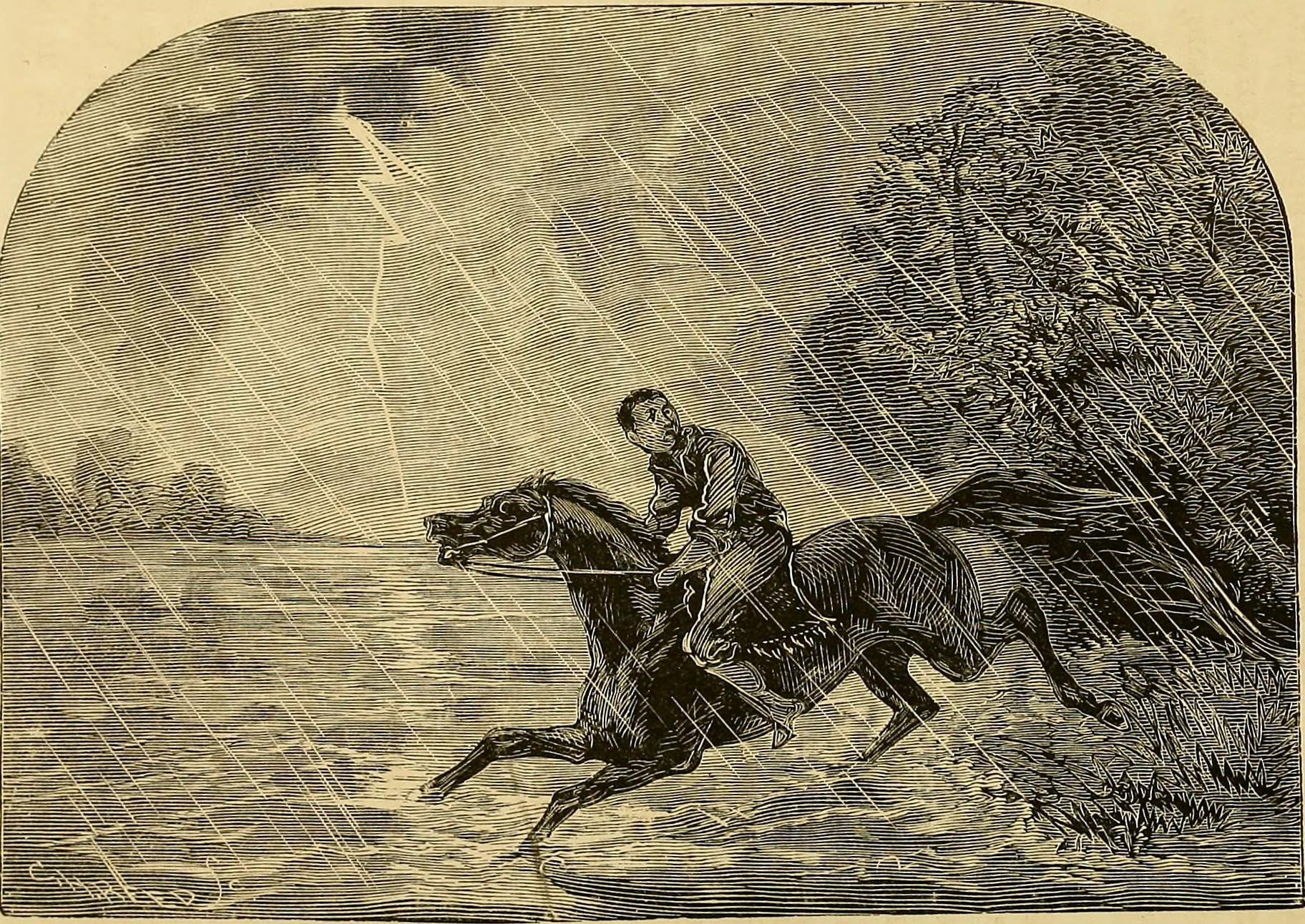
Some enslaved people escaped from slavery using their enslaver's horse.

During the American Revolutionary War, enslaved people escaped from bondage and fled to British forces, Canada, Florida, and Native American lands. The last Royal Governor of Virginia, Lord Dunmore, planned to weaken American colonists by issuing a proclamation in 1775 that gave freedom to the enslaved who escaped their American colonial masters and joined the British. According to a PBS and National Park Service article this proclamation resulted in an estimated 100,000 freedom seekers escaping during the war. American colonial officers received numerous requests for the return of escaped slaves. In November of 1775, Dunmore started a military unit of 300 freedom seekers in North Carolina called "the Ethiopian Regiment." In Virginia 800 freedom seekers joined the regiment. American colonists tried to deter freedom seekers from joining the British by sending slave patrols to stop runaways, and published newspapers and editorials stating the British will not act on their promise of granting freedom to runaway slaves. Thousands of free and enslaved Black people fought with the British in hopes to gain their freedom were called Black Loyalists. Black Loyalists who served with the British for one year received Certificates of Freedom and were taken to Caribbean British colonies to live as free people in the Bahamas and Jamaica, and others were taken north to Canada. Between 1783 and 1785, 3,000 enslaved and free Black Americans settled in the British colony of Nova Scotia, Canada. Other enslaved people ran away to join the Continental Army or Patriot militias. Black Americans who fought in the Continental Army were called Black Patriots, and some did earn their freedom through their military service. Some enslaved runaways took the war as an opportunity to escape using their enslaver's horse.

== War of 1812 routes ==
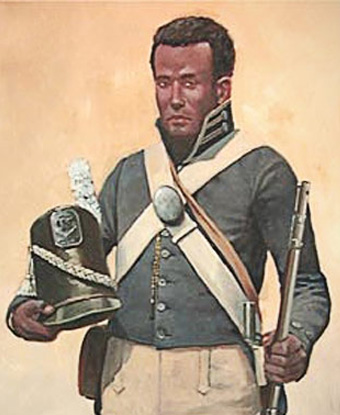
William Williams was an enslaved runaway and a Black Soldier in the U.S. Army in the War of 1812.

During the War of 1812, 700 enslaved people in Maryland escaped from slavery. Before the war, freedom seekers escaped to the Michigan Territory by crossing the Detroit River. Over the years the numbers of escaped African Americans grew in the territory. Territorial governor William Hull offered Peter Denison, an enslaved man, "a written license" allowing him to form a militia company of free Blacks and escaped slaves. The men were armed and trained but Hull disbanded the militia. Some of the Black men in the militia escaped from slavery in British Canada. In the 18th century, slavery was practiced in Canada, and by 1793 it was phased out, but some Black Canadians remained enslaved. During the late 18th century and early 19th century, the route of freedom seekers went south beginning in British Canada to their final destination in free American territories in the Old Northwest. By the War of 1812, slave laws in British Canada prohibited the continuation of slavery. This changed the final destinations of freedom seekers in the United States to look north to Canada to obtain their freedom. In the summer of 1812, Hull declared that enslaved runaways and free Blacks in the Michigan Territory were free citizens, and when war broke out with Britain, Black citizens of Michigan were armed to fight against the British. After his military service, Peter Denison and his family left Michigan and relocated north to Canada.

== Black refugees ==
In April 1814, the British Army promised freedom to enslaved Black Americans who joined the British military or who choose freedom in British colonies. In the Chesapeake Region of Virginia and Maryland and coastal areas of Georgia, about 4,000 enslaved Black Americans escaped from slavery. Within the number of 4,000 freedom seekers who escaped, 2,000 sailed to Nova Scotia between September 1813 and August 1816 on naval vessels and private ships chartered by the British and were taken to Nova Scotia and New Brunswick, Canada and 400 freedom seekers were taken to Trinidad in the Caribbean. The Black people who settled in British Canada are known as Black refugees who escaped slavery in the United States and sided with the British during the War of 1812.

== Merikens ==
The Merikins were formerly enslaved Black Americans that escaped slavery and joined the British military's all-Black unit of Colonial Marines during the War of 1812. When the war ended, they were taken to numerous British colonies to live as free people. About 700 Colonial Marines were taken to Trinidad in the Caribbean. Although slavery was legal in Trinidad, they were guaranteed protection under commander Robert Mitchell. The formerly Black Americans called themselves Merikens, "an abbreviated word for 'Americans'" and started new lives in Trinidad in six Company Villages in the southern part of the island. The Trinidadian government provided the Merikens with food, rations, clothing, and tools needed to build their homes, and they grew their own food of corn, pumpkin, plantain, and rice.

== The "Saltwater Railroad" freedom route ==
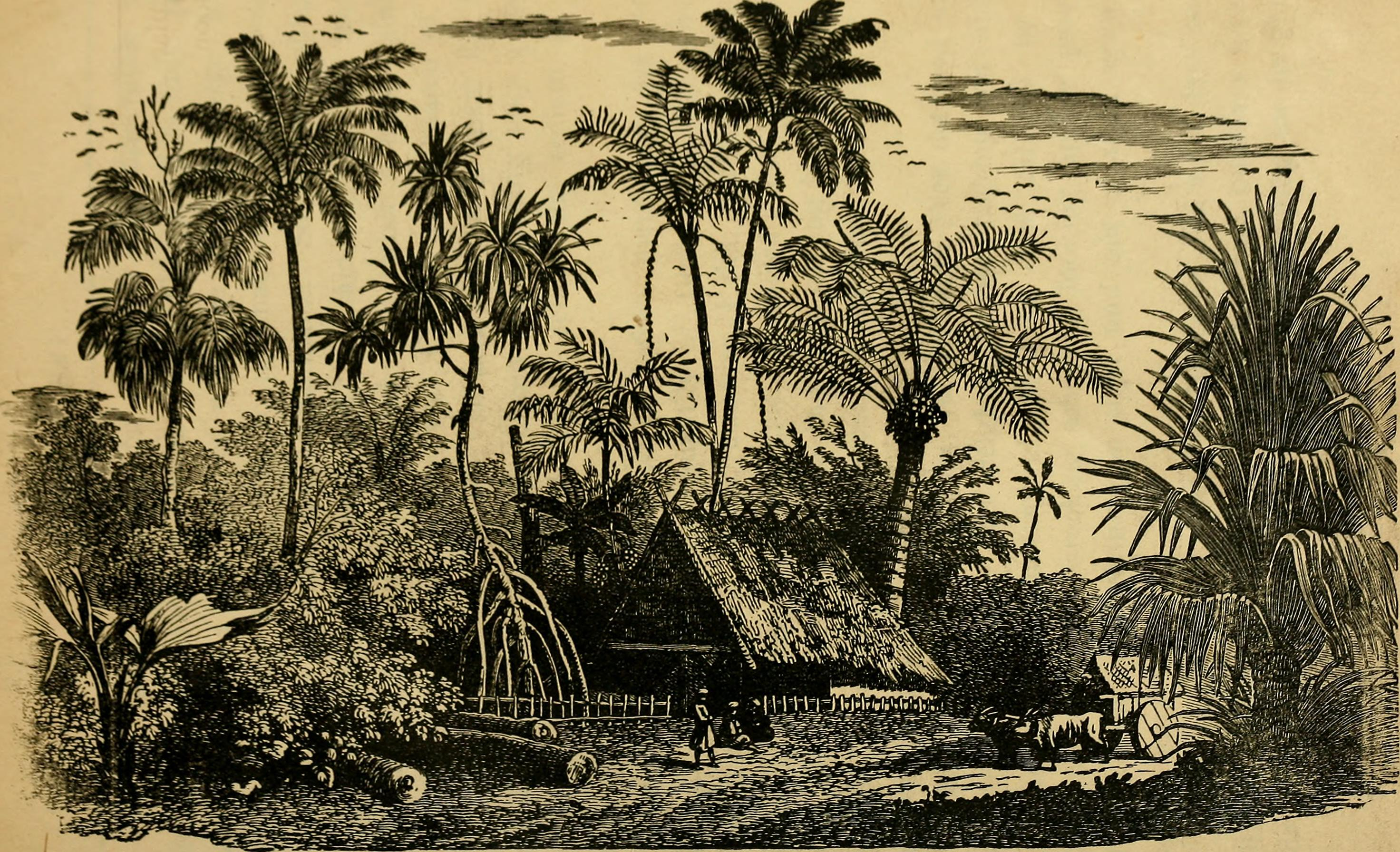
A scene in the Bahamas in 1884

From 1821 to 1861, freedom seekers escaped from the Southeastern slave states of South Carolina, Georgia, and Florida to the Bahamas on a secret route called the "Saltwater Railroad." Prior to 1821, In Florida, a Spanish colony that historians know as Spanish Florida, enslaved runaways were declared free under Spanish laws. However, by 1821 Florida was under the control of the United States. Free Blacks in Florida feared they might be re-enslaved under American laws and hundreds of free people escaped to the Bahamas. From 1821 to 1825, the Southern beaches of Florida provided a safe haven for freedom seekers looking to escape on boats that departed from Florida going to the island. Other freedom seekers escaped by making their own canoes and boats and sailed to the Bahamas unaided.

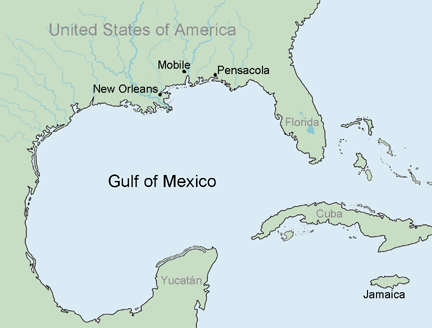
Enslaved people in the United States departed off the Southern Florida coast in boats and escaped to the Bahamas.

By 1825, the construction of the Cape Florida Lighthouse (in present-day Miami-Dade County) was a setback to enslaved runaways looking to escape at night on boats off the Florida coast due to the bright light that was helpful to guide sailors off the Florida Reef. The Bahamas attracted enslaved people because there was a community of Black Seminoles and other escapees. The Bahamas was a British controlled island where under local imperial practices Black people owned land, had access to education, and were legally married. In addition, in 1825, Britain declared that any escapees reaching British controlled lands were free. This declaration resulted in hundreds of more slaves in the United States to escape to the island. By the 1830s, historians estimate that at least 6,000 freedom seekers made their way to the Bahamas, and by the 1840s, the Bahamas had more enslaved runaways than any British colony in the Caribbean. The actions of Britain to liberate enslaved Americans strained political relationships with the United States. In 1841 on the slave ship, Creole, a slave revolt occurred. The Creole departed from Virginia with over one hundred enslaved people heading to New Orleans, Louisiana. The enslaved revolted and took control of the ship and sailed it to Nassau in the Bahamas. This revolt sparked international attention; the escapees were charged but later released.

== Fugitive Slave Act of 1850 ==
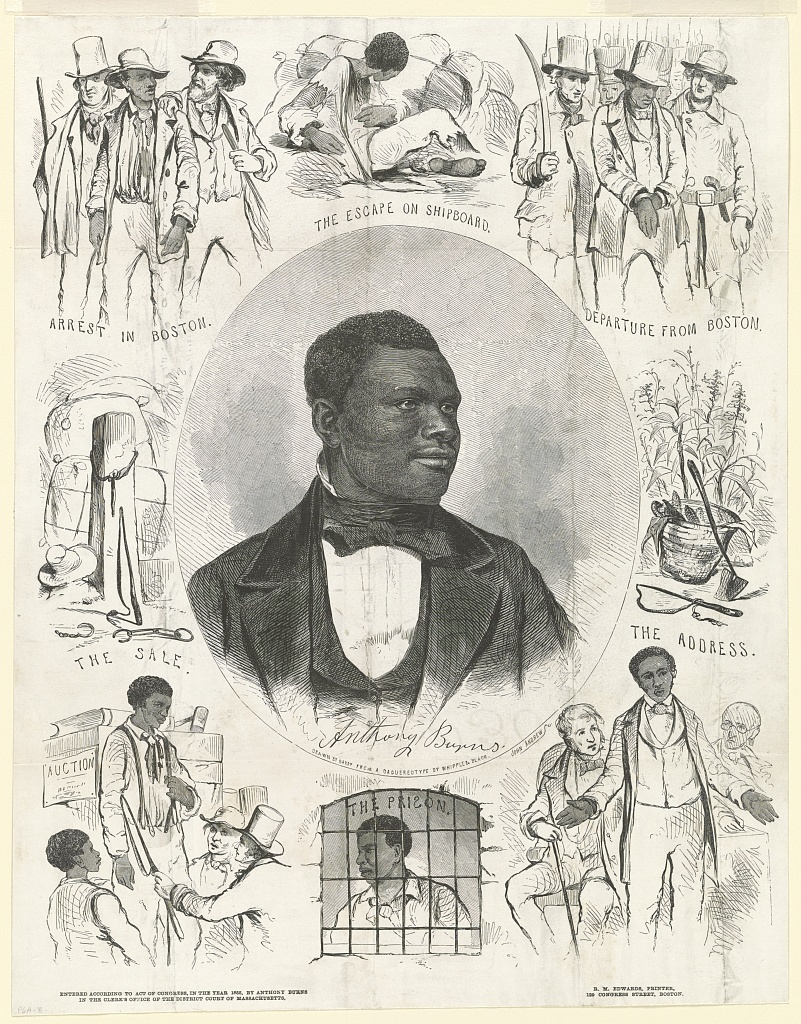
A portrait of freedom seeker Anthony Burns, arrested under the Fugitive Slave Law

Under the terms of the Fugitive Slave Act of 1850, when suspected fugitives were seized and brought to a special magistrate known as a commissioner, they had no right to a jury trial and could not testify on their own behalf. Between 1850 and 1860, 343 freedom seekers were taken before a commissioner and 332 were returned to slavery. Commissioners received ten dollars when they ruled in favor of a slaveholder and received five dollars if they ruled in a slave's favor. Technically, they were not accused of a crime. The marshal or private slave-catcher needed only to swear an oath to acquire a writ of replevin for the return of property. A fine of 1,000 dollars was charged to individuals who assisted a freedom seeker's escape.

Congress was dominated by Southern congressmen because the population of their states was bolstered by the inclusion of three-fifths of the number of slaves in population totals. They passed the Fugitive Slave Law of 1850 because of frustration at having fugitives from slavery helped by the public and even official institutions outside the South. In some parts of the North, slave catchers needed police protection.

According to author Andrew Delbanco, "Northerners began to realize slavery wasn't just a Southern issue after the passage of the 1850 law." Prior to the American Civil War, the nation was divided on how to deal with enslaved runaways. The Fugitive Slave Act further divided the nation as Southern slaveholders now had political power to return freedom seekers who escaped to the North and return them to the South, and Northerners were required by law to assist in the return of runaways.

Some freedom seekers were arrested under the fugitive slave law; they were, Anthony Burns, John Price, Shadrach Minkins, Stephen Pembroke and his two sons, and others. Abolitionists used these cases to push the question of slavery at the center of national politics; they argued that enslaved people's resistance to enslavement through numerous escapes advocates the abolition of slavery.

A few weeks after the fugitive slave law passed, Black populations in Northern cities declined due to formerly enslaved African Americans migrating to Canada in fear they might be captured and re-enslaved. On August 1, 1834, Britain abolished slavery in Canada and throughout the British Empire, making Canada a safer choice for American slaves and free Blacks seeking freedom. In Pittsburgh, Pennsylvania most of the Black waiters working in the city's hotel fled to Canada. Columbia, Pennsylvania's Black population decreased by half. Between mid-February and early March 1851, one hundred free African Americans and fugitives fled the city of Boston. Abolitionists in Detroit, Michigan guided 1,200 free people to Canada. By December 1850, it is estimated that 3,000 African Americans took refuge in Canada.

== American Civil War routes (1861 to 1865) ==
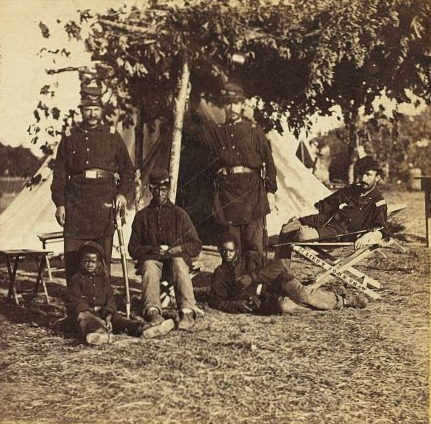
Enslaved people who escaped to Union lines during the Civil War were called "contraband".

Enslaved people arrive in Fort Monroe during Underground Railroad.

During the American Civil War, the Union Army captured Southern towns in Beaufort, South Carolina, St. Simons Island, Georgia, and other areas and setup encampments. As a result, enslaved people on nearby plantations escaped from slavery and ran to Union lines for freedom and to sign up to fight in the Union Army. American historian Eric Foner explains in his book, Gateway to Freedom: The Hidden History of the Underground Railroad, that: "...the Civil War fundamentally transformed the opportunities available for slaves seeking freedom. As soon as federal troops which in Maryland meant the very beginning of the war, slaves sought refuge with the Union..." Susie King Taylor was born enslaved in Liberty County, Georgia and escaped from slavery with her family to Union lines in St. Catherine's Island, Georgia with the help of her uncle who put her on a federal gunboat plying the waters near Confederate-held Fort Pulaski. In addition, thousands of enslaved Black Americans escaped slavery and fled to Union lines in the South Carolina Sea Islands. In 1861, Jarvis Harvey escaped from slavery and sailed to Union lines at Fortress Monroe, Virginia. Robert Sutton was born enslaved in Alberti Plantation along Florida's northeastern boundary with Georgia, and during the Civil War he escaped from slavery by making a canoe and sailed out to Port Royal, South Carolina where Black Americans were freed from slavery after the Battle of Port Royal and signed up to fight in the 1st South Carolina Volunteer Infantry Regiment. Prince Rivers escaped from slavery and found freedom in Union lines in Port Royal, South Carolina after his enslaver fled Beaufort upon arrival of the Union Navy and Army. Rivers later signed up to fight in the 1st South Carolina Volunteer Infantry Regiment. On May 12, 1862, Robert Smalls and sixteen enslaved people escaped from slavery during the Civil War on a Confederate ship and sailed it out the Charleston Harbor to a Union blockade in South Carolina.

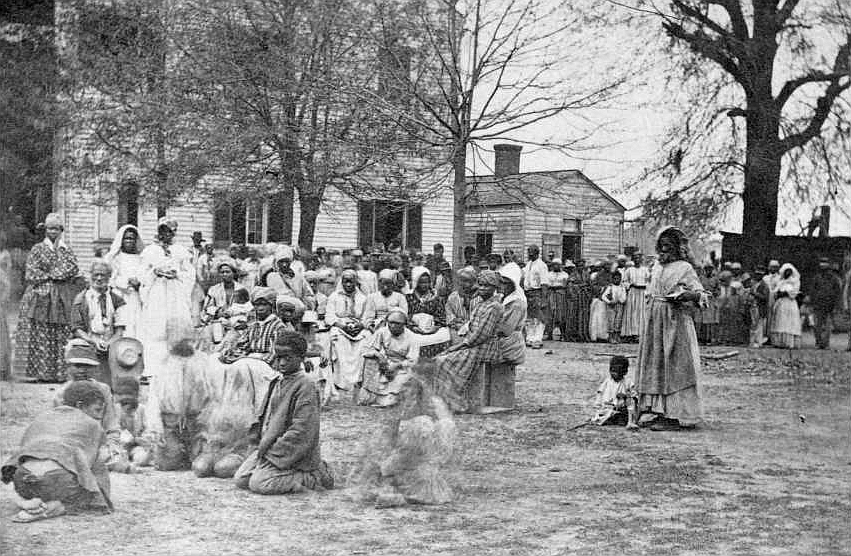
Contraband camps were formed during the Civil War and provided refuge and protection to newly freed people in Union occupied territories of the South.

Underground Railroad agents shifted their efforts and escape plans around Union encampments because large numbers of freedom seekers escaped to Union occupied territories and not the North for their freedom. For example, the Kansas territory became a state in 1861, and slavery was prohibited in the state of Kansas. During the Civil War, abolitionists, free staters, and Jayhawkers helped to emancipate freedom seekers who escaped slavery from Missouri (a slave state that bordered Kansas) and brought them back to Kansas as contraband of war. An article from the National Park Service explains how the Civil War shifted the escape routes and final destinations of freedom seekers: "But, no sooner had Union troops appeared in the border states, on the islands off the Atlantic coast, and in the lower Mississippi Valley, than thousands of blacks took the opportunity to liberate themselves by absconding to the Yankee (Union) camps. A first effort to send them back to their masters was soon abandoned. The runaways became 'contraband,' or confiscated property of war. Many of them quickly found work within the Union lines and members of their families began to join them."

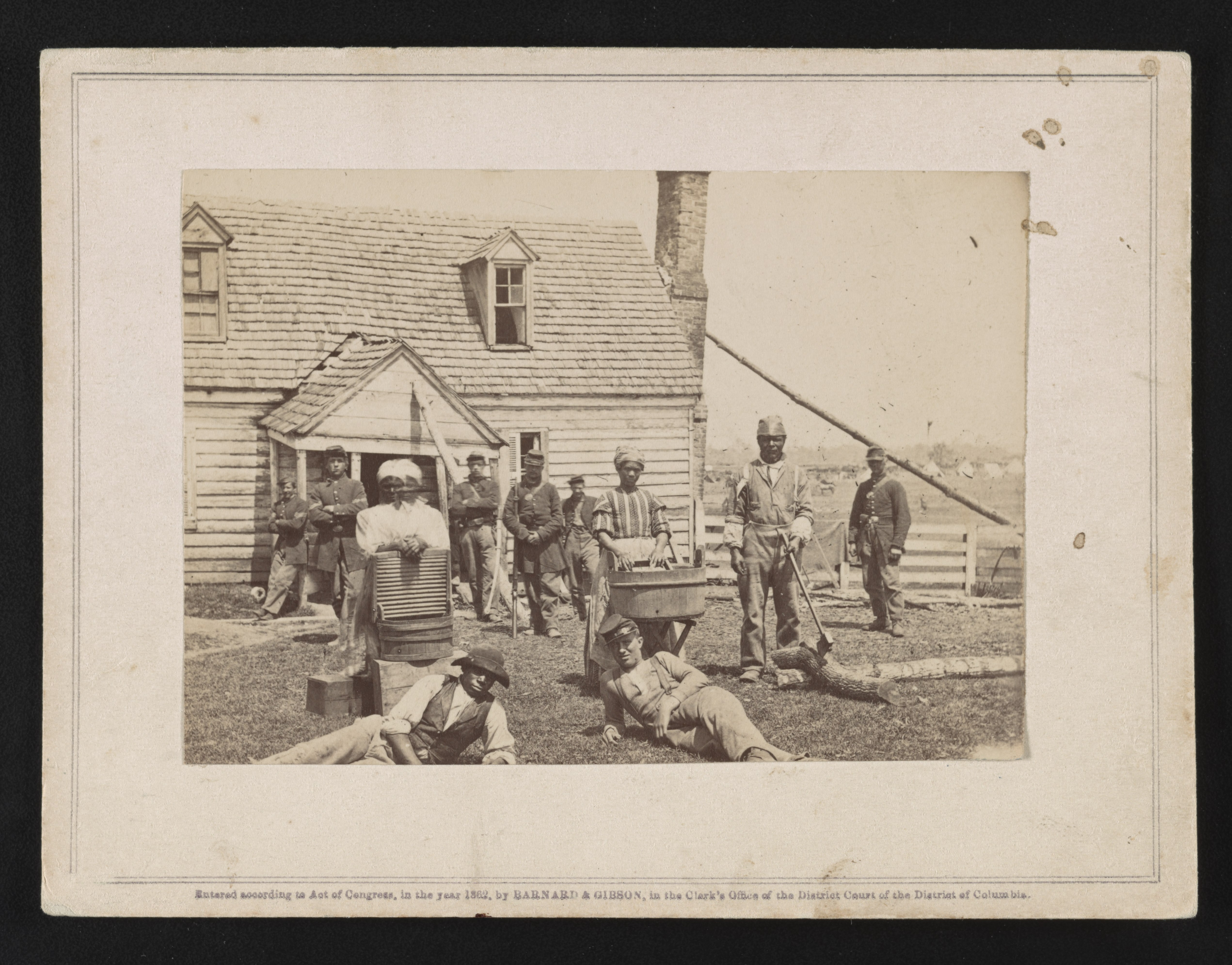
Contrabands at headquarters of General Lafayette in Yorktown, Virginia

The word contraband was given to enslaved runaways by Union General Benjamin Butler. In 1861, three enslaved men in Norfolk, Virginia, Shepard Mallory, Frank Baker, and James Townsend, escaped from slavery and fled to Union lines at Fort Monroe. Butler refused to act on the Fugitive Slave Law of 1850 that required the return of escaped slaves to their enslavers. Instead, Butler kept the three men because they were "property" of the Confederate States and not the United States where the Fugitive Slave Act was passed and enforced. An article from the National Trust for Historical Preservation explains: "...Butler realized the absurdity of honoring the Fugitive Slave Law, which dictated that he return the three runaways to their owner. They had been helping to construct a Confederate battery that threatened his fort. Why send them back and bolster that effort? So the general struck upon a politically expedient solution: Because Virginia had seceded from the Union, he argued, he no longer had a constitutional obligation to return the runaways. Rather, in keeping with military law governing war between nations, he would seize the three runaways as contraband—property to be used by the enemy against the Union."

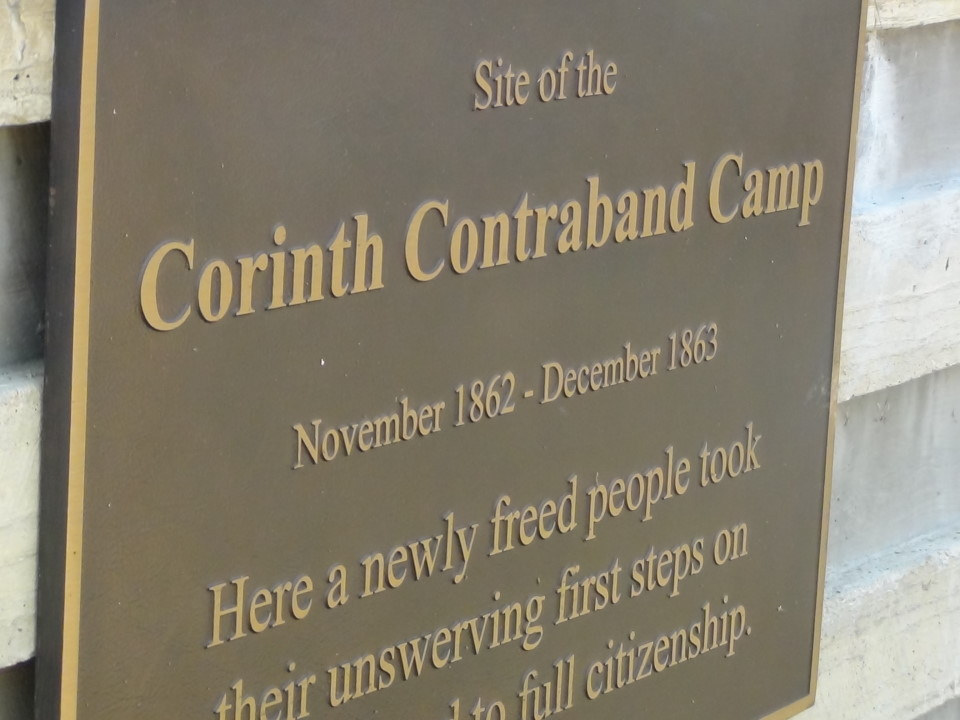
A plaque to remember Corinth Contraband Camp

As the Civil War continued, areas of the South and border states became refugee camps for freedom seekers. Washington D.C. was a large refugee area during the war. On April 16, 1862, Congress passed the Compensated Emancipation Act that abolished slavery in the District of Columbia. After the passage of this act, freedom seekers from Virginia and Maryland escaped and found freedom in the District of Columbia, and by 1863, there were 10,000 refugees (former runaway slaves) in the city and their numbers doubled the Black population in Washington, D.C. During the war, enslaved people living near Beaufort County, South Carolina escaped from slavery and fled to Union lines in Beaufort because African Americans in the county were freed from slavery after the Battle of Port Royal on November 7, 1861 when the plantation owners fled the area after the arrival of the Union Navy and Army. As a result, a refugee camp was started to provide safety and protection to freedom seekers. In the beginning there were sixty to seventy runaways, but as time progressed the numbers of refugees grew to 320. The Union Army did not have enough food rations and clothes to take care of them. Free men, women, and children in Beaufort's refugee camp were paid to work for the Union as cooks, laundress, servants, and carpenters. Union forces occupied Corinth, Mississippi and slaves from nearby plantations escaped to Union lines. To accommodate the freedom seekers, general Grenville M. Dodge established the Corinth Contraband Camp with homes, schools, hospitals, churches, and paid employment for African Americans. It was estimated that Corinth Contraband Camp provided a new life for 6,000 former slaves.

== Union Navy and Emancipation ==
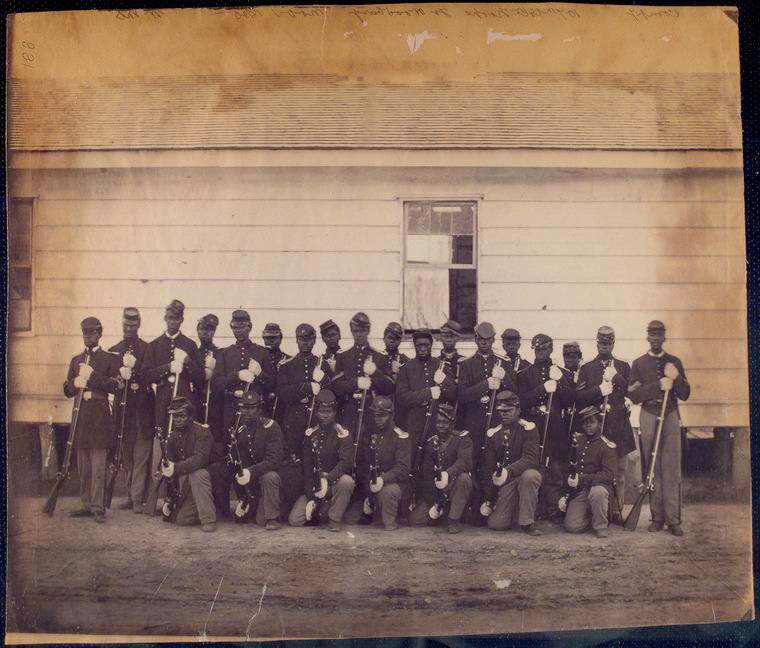
Free Blacks and former slaves who escaped slavery signed up to fight in the Union Army and Navy.

The Secretary of the Navy during the Civil War was Gideon Welles and in September 1861 Welles declared that enslaved and free African Americans could enlist at the lowest rating of "Boy" in the Union Navy. Union vessels located in Southern ports received numbers of runaways who fled slavery by way of small boats to vessels docked in Union controlled territories. Benjamin Gould recorded in his journal that by September 22, 1862, eight freedom seekers had arrived at the USS Cambridge and that 20 more runaways arrived two weeks later. One of the escaped freedom seekers listed was William Gould, who later joined the Union (U.S.) Navy and fought against the Confederacy from 1862 to 1865. The Union vessel USS Hartford helped to liberate enslaved people while going up the Mississippi River. Bartholomew Diggins, who served aboard the vessel, recalled the events of liberating the enslaved. He said: "we picked [up] many negroes [sic] slaves who would come out to the ships in small boats at every place we anchored." Other Union vessels that helped to liberate the enslaved were the USS Essex and USS Iroquois. A few Union soldiers and sailors returned escaped slaves back to their enslavers. By the end of the war, 179,000 formerly enslaved and free Black Americans had fought in the Union Army, and 21,000 had fought in the Union Navy.

From the American Revolutionary War, through the War of 1812, and then the American Civil War, the Underground Railroad contributed to hundreds and sometimes thousands of escapes by African Americans.

== Legal and political ==
When frictions between North and South culminated in the Civil War, many Black people, both enslaved and free, fought for the Union Army. Following Union victory in the Civil War, on December 6, 1865, the Thirteenth Amendment to the Constitution outlawed slavery except as punishment for a crime. Following its passage, in some cases the Underground Railroad operated in the opposite direction, as people who had escaped to Canada returned to the United States.

=== Criticism ===
Frederick Douglass was a writer and orator who had escaped slavery. He wrote critically of the attention drawn to the ostensibly secret Underground Railroad in his first autobiography, Narrative of the Life of Frederick Douglass, an American Slave (1845):

I have never approved of the very public manner in which some of our western friends have conducted what they call the Underground Railroad, but which I think, by their open declarations, has been made most emphatically the upperground railroad.

He went on to say that, although he honored the movement, he felt that the efforts at publicity served more to enlighten the slave-owners than the slaves, making them more watchful and making it more difficult for future slaves to escape.

== Arrival in Canada ==
External videos
- "Underground Railroad" – Historica Canada. - Heritage Minutes (1:01 min)

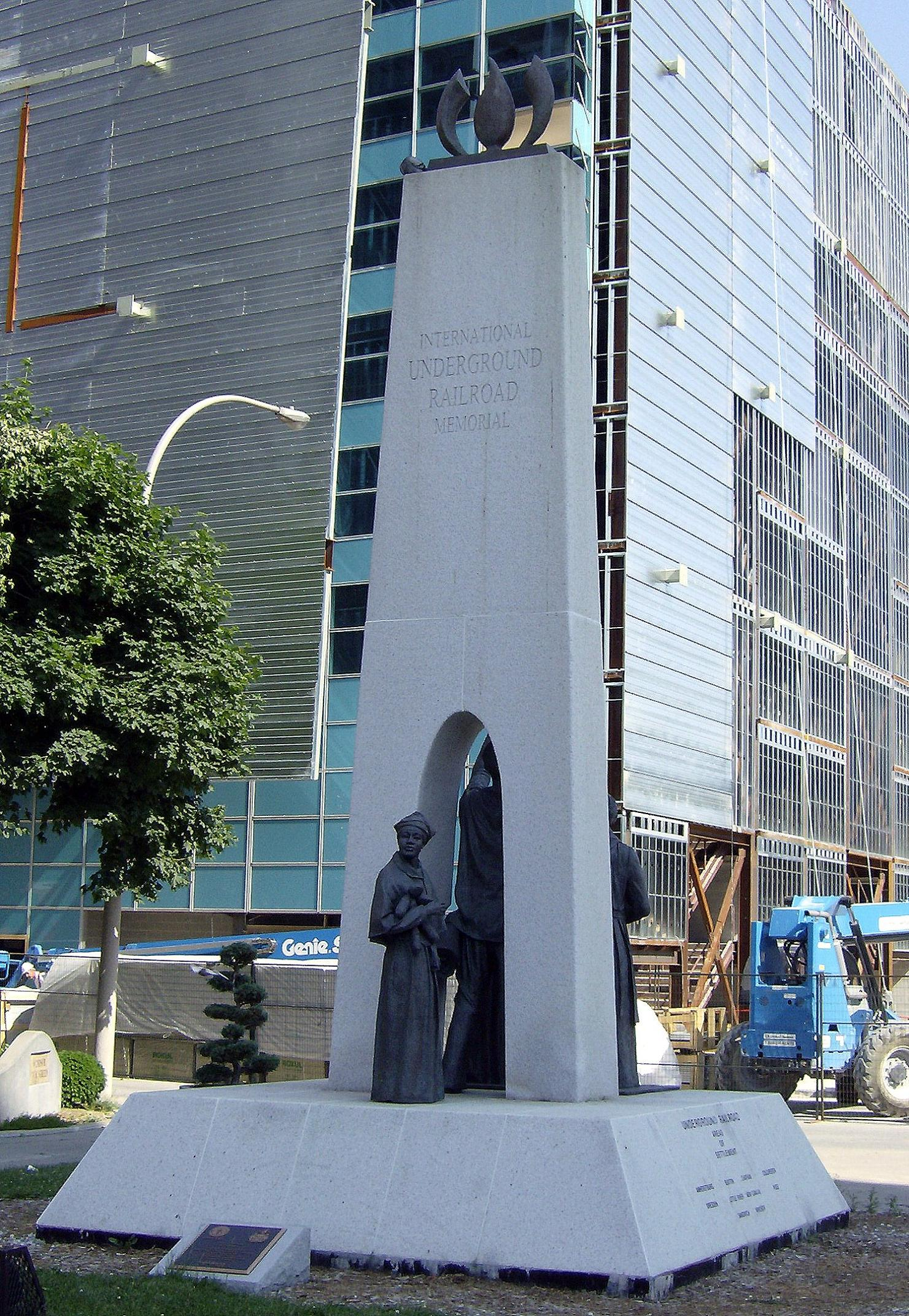
International Underground Railroad Memorial in Windsor, Ontario

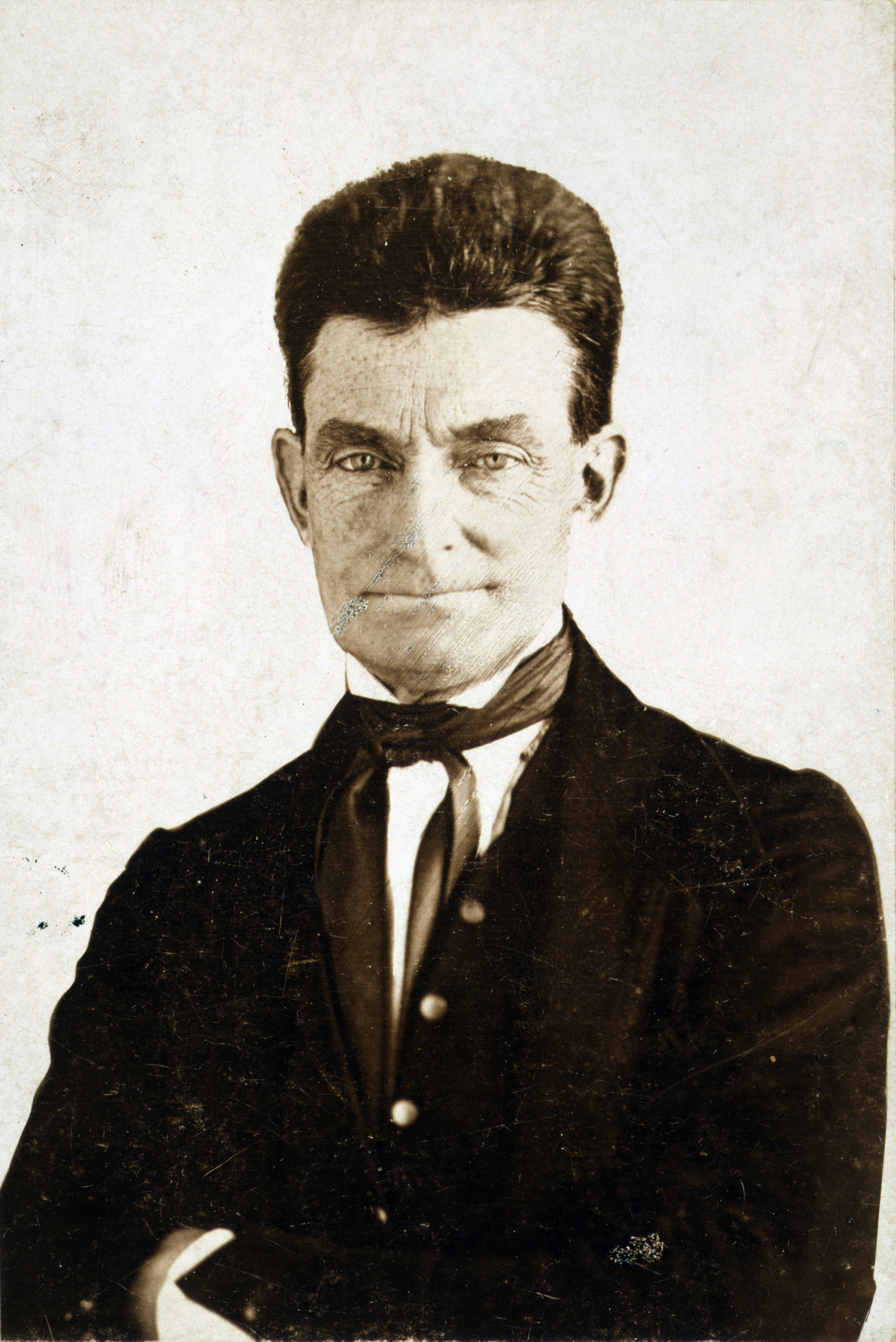
John Brown participated in the Underground Railroad as an abolitionist.

British North America (present-day Canada) was a desirable destination, as its long border gave many points of access, it was farther from slave catchers, and it was beyond the reach of the United States' Fugitive Slave Acts. Further, slavery ended decades earlier in Canada than in the United States. Britain banned the institution of slavery in present-day Canada (and in most British colonies) in 1833, though the practice of slavery in Canada had effectively ended already early in the 19th century through case law, due to court decisions resulting from litigation on behalf of slaves seeking manumission.

Most former enslaved, reaching Canada by boat across Lake Erie and Lake Ontario, settled in Ontario. More than 30,000 people were said to have escaped there via the network during its 20-year peak period, although U.S. census figures account for only 6,000. Numerous fugitives' stories are documented in the 1872 book The Underground Railroad Records by William Still, an abolitionist who then headed the Philadelphia Vigilance Committee.

Estimates vary widely, but at least 30,000 slaves, and potentially more than 100,000, escaped to Canada via the Underground Railroad. The largest group settled in Upper Canada (Ontario), called Canada West from 1841. Numerous Black Canadian communities developed in Southern Ontario. These were generally in the triangular region bounded by Niagara Falls, Toronto, and Windsor. Several rural villages made up mostly of people freed from slavery were established in Kent and Essex counties in Ontario.

Fort Malden, in Amherstburg, Ontario, was deemed the "chief place of entry" for escaped slaves seeking to enter Canada. The abolitionist Levi Coffin, who was known for aiding over 2,000 fugitives to safety, supported this choice. He described Fort Malden as "the great landing place, the principle terminus of the underground railroad of the west." After 1850, approximately thirty people a day were crossing over to Fort Malden by steamboat. The Sultana was one of the ships, making "frequent round trips" between Great Lakes ports. Its captain, C.W. Appleby, a celebrated mariner, facilitated the conveyance of several fugitives from various Lake Erie ports to Fort Malden. Other fugitives at Fort Malden had been assisted by William Wells Brown, himself someone who had escaped slavery. He found employment on a Lake Erie steamer and transported numerous fugitives from Cleveland to Ontario by way of Buffalo or Detroit. "It is well known," he tells us, "That a great number of fugitives make their escape to Canada, by way of Cleaveland. [sic] ...The friends of the slave, knowing that I would transport them without charge, never failed to have a delegation when the boat arrived at Cleaveland. [sic] I have sometimes had four or five on board at one time."

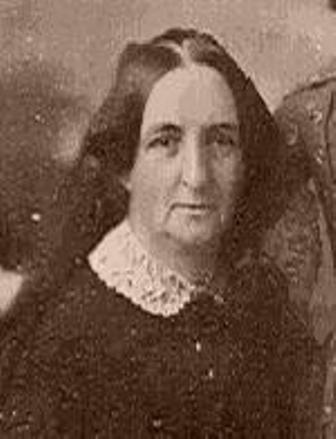
Martha Coffin Wright operated her house in Auburn, New York as a stop on the Underground Railroad and it was frequented by Harriet Tubman during her rescue missions. Wright's house connected to other network of safe houses in New York that led to Canada.

Another important destination was Nova Scotia, which was first settled by Black Loyalists during the American Revolution and then by Black Refugees during the War of 1812 (see Black Nova Scotians). Important Black settlements also developed in other parts of British North America (now parts of Canada). These included Lower Canada (present-day Quebec) and Vancouver Island, where Governor James Douglas encouraged Black immigration because of his opposition to slavery. He also hoped a significant Black community would form a bulwark against those who wished to unite the island with the United States.

Upon arriving at their destinations, many freedom seekers were disappointed, as life in Canada was difficult. While not at risk from slave catchers due to being in a different country, racial discrimination was still widespread. Many of the new arrivals had to compete with mass European immigration for jobs, and overt racism was common. For example, in reaction to Black Loyalists being settled in eastern Canada by the Crown, the city of Saint John, New Brunswick, amended its charter in 1785 specifically to exclude Blacks from practicing a trade, selling goods, fishing in the harbor, or becoming freemen; these provisions stood until 1870.

With the outbreak of the Civil War in the U.S., many black refugees left Canada to enlist in the Union Army. While some later returned to Canada, many remained in the United States. Thousands of others returned to the American South after the war ended. The desire to reconnect with friends and family was strong, and most were hopeful about the changes emancipation and Reconstruction would bring.

== Folklore ==
Since the 1980s, claims have arisen that quilt designs were used to signal and direct enslaved people to escape routes and assistance. According to advocates of the quilt theory, ten quilt patterns were used to direct enslaved people to take particular actions. The quilts were placed one at a time on a fence as a means of nonverbal communication to alert escaping slaves. The code had a dual meaning: first to signal enslaved people to prepare to escape, and second to give clues and indicate directions on the journey.

The quilt design theory is disputed. The first published work documenting an oral history source was in 1999, and the first publication of this theory is believed to be a 1980 children's book. Quilt historians and scholars of pre-Civil War (1820–1860) America have disputed this legend. There is no contemporary evidence of any sort of quilt code, and quilt historians such as Pat Cummings and Barbara Brackman have raised serious questions about the idea. In addition, Underground Railroad historian Giles Wright has published a pamphlet debunking the quilt code.

Similarly, some popular, nonacademic sources claim that spirituals and other songs, such as "Steal Away" or "Follow the Drinking Gourd", contained coded information and helped individuals navigate the railroad. They have offered little evidence to support their claims. Scholars tend to believe that while the slave songs may certainly have expressed hope for deliverance from the sorrows of this world, these songs did not present literal help for runaway slaves.

The Underground Railroad inspired cultural works. For example, "Song of the Free", written in 1860 about a man fleeing slavery in Tennessee by escaping to Canada, was composed to the tune of "Oh! Susanna". Every stanza ends with a reference to Canada as the land "where colored men are free". Slavery in Upper Canada (now Ontario) was outlawed in 1793; in 1819, John Robinson, the Attorney General of Upper Canada, declared that by residing in Canada, black residents were set free, and that Canadian courts would protect their freedom. Slavery in Canada as a whole had been in rapid decline after an 1803 court ruling, and was finally abolished outright in 1834.

=== Notable people ===
- Ann Bamford
- John Brown
- Owen Brown (father)
- Owen Brown (son)
- Samuel Burris
- Obadiah Bush
- Rial Cheadle
- Levi Coffin
- Elizabeth Rous Comstock
- George Corson
- Moses Dickson
- Frederick Douglass
- Asa Drury
- George Hussey Earle Sr.
- Calvin Fairbank
- Bartholomew Fussell
- Matilda Joslyn Gage
- Thomas Galt
- Thomas Garrett
- Sydney Howard Gay
- Josiah Bushnell Grinnell
- Frances Harper
- Laura Smith Haviland
- Lewis Hayden
- John Hunn
- Roger Hooker Leavitt
- Jermain Wesley Loguen
- Samuel Joseph May
- John Berry Meachum
- Mary Meachum
- Cynthia Catlin Miller
- William M. Mitchell
- Solomon Northup
- John Parker
- Elijah F. Pennypacker
- Mary Ellen Pleasant
- John Wesley Posey
- Amy and Isaac Post
- Peter Quire
- John Rankin
- Alexander Milton Ross
- David Ruggles
- Gerrit Smith
- George Luther Stearns
- William Still
- John Ton
- Charles Turner Torrey
- William Troy
- Harriet Tubman
- Martha Coffin Wright
- John Van Zandt
- Bernardhus Van Leer
- Silvia and John Webber
- Edward Wetherill

== National Underground Railroad Network ==
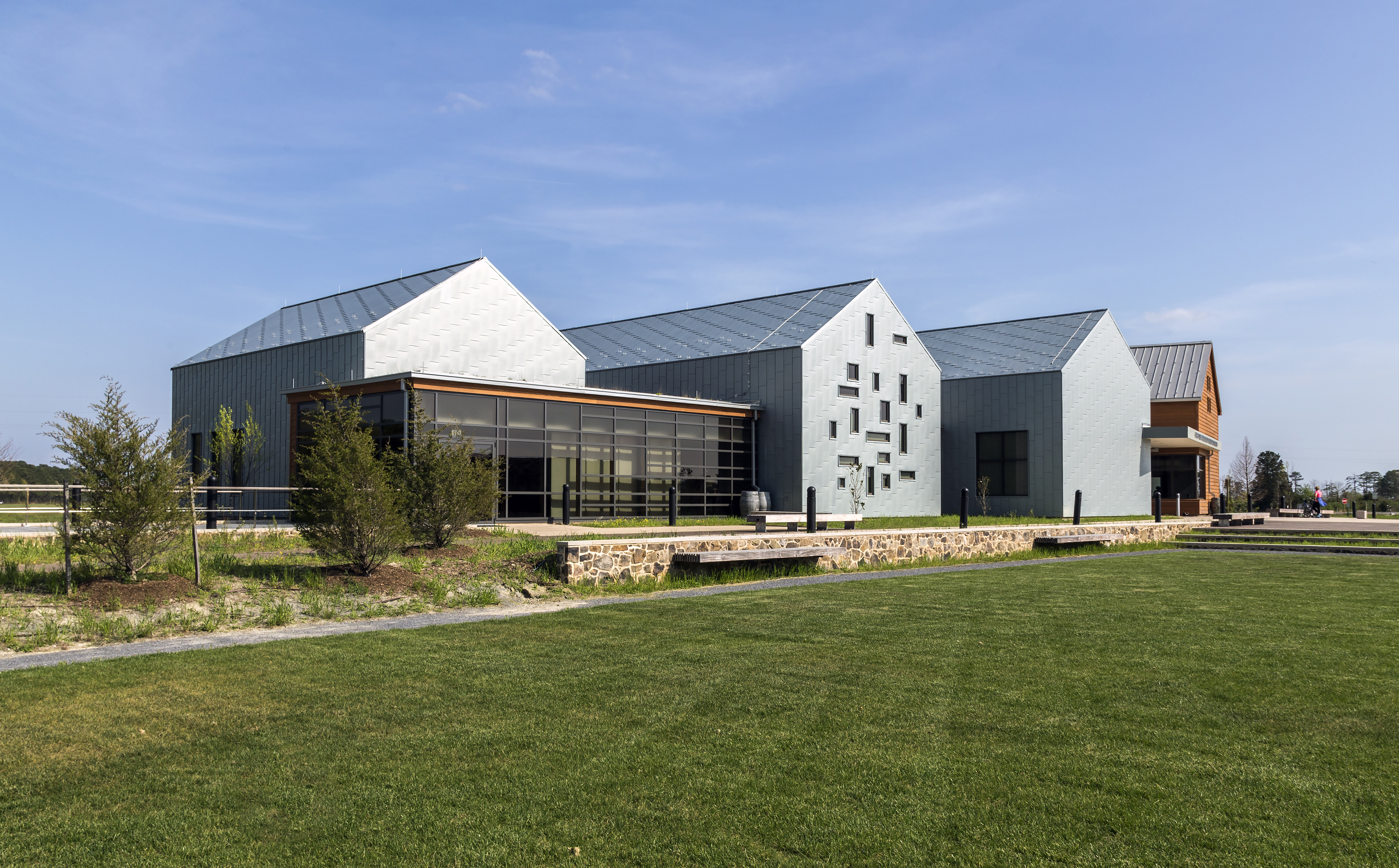
The Harriet Tubman Underground Railroad National Historical Park in Dorchester County, Maryland

Following upon legislation passed in 1990 for the National Park Service to perform a special resource study of the Underground Railroad, in 1997, the 105th Congress introduced and subsequently passed H.R. 1635 – National Underground Railroad Network to Freedom Act of 1998, which President Bill Clinton signed into law that year. This act authorized the United States National Park Service to establish the National Underground Railroad Network to Freedom program to identify associated sites, as well as preserve them and popularize the Underground Railroad and stories of people involved in it. The National Park Service has designated many sites within the network, posted stories about people and places, sponsors an essay contest, and holds a national conference about the Underground Railroad in May or June each year.

The Harriet Tubman Underground Railroad National Historical Park, which includes Underground Railroad routes in three counties of Maryland's Eastern Shore and Harriet Tubman's birthplace, was created by President Barack Obama under the Antiquities Act on March 25, 2013. Its sister park, the Harriet Tubman National Historical Park in Auburn, New York, was established on January 10, 2017, and focuses on the later years of Tubman's life as well as her involvement with the Underground Railroad and the abolition movement.

== International Underground Railroad Month ==
The month of September was designated International Underground Railroad Month, because September was the month Harriet Tubman and Frederick Douglass escaped from slavery.

== In popular culture ==
=== Inspirations for fiction ===
- The Underground Railroad is a 2016 novel by Colson Whitehead. It won the 2016 National Book Award and the 2017 Pulitzer Prize for Fiction.
- The Underground Railroad is a 2021 streaming television limited series, based on Whitehead's novel.
- Underground is an American television series that premiered in 2016, on WGN America.

=== Literature ===
- David Walker, Appeal to the Coloured Citizens of the World (1829)
- Harriet Beecher Stowe, Uncle Tom's Cabin (1852)
- Caroline Lee Hentz, The Planter's Northern Bride (1854)
- William M. Mitchell, The Under-Ground Railroad (1860)
- Sarah Hopkins Bradford, Scenes in the Life of Harriet Tubman (1869); Harriet Tubman, Moses of Her People (1896)
- Barbara Smucker, Underground to Canada (1977)

=== Music ===
Underground Railroad was a company created by Tupac Shakur, Big D the Impossible, Shock G, Pee Wee, Jeremy, Raw Fusion and Live Squad with the purpose of promoting and helping young black women and men with creating records, allowing them to initiate and develop their musical careers.

=== Comics ===
In Big Jim and the White Boy, David F. Walker and Marcus Kwame Anderson's 2024 graphic novel retelling of Mark Twain's Adventures of Huckleberry Finn, Big Jim and Huck become Underground Railroad agents as they journey through Civil War-era United States to rescue the former's enslaved family.

== See also ==
- Ausable Chasm, NY, home of the North Star Underground Railroad Museum
- Caroline Quarlls (1824–1892), first known person to escape slavery through Wisconsin's Underground Railroad
- Fort Mose Historic State Park
- Josiah Henson Museum of African-Canadian History near Dresden, Ontario
- List of Underground Railroad sites
- Tilly Escape
- Timbuctoo, New York
