= Rial Cheadle =

American underground railroad conductor

- Born: 1801; Big Bottom, Ohio
- Died: Unknown
- Occupation: Conductor of the Underground Railroad

Rial Cheadle (or Rial "Chedle") (1801 – 1867) of the Ohio Cheadles, was a prominent conductor in the Ohio Underground Railroad. Born in 1801 at Big Bottom (the site of the Big Bottom Massacre and near the present-day site of Stockport, Ohio), he, along with the abolitionist Rev. Bennett Roberts, taught school and spoke against slavery. Under the influence of both Cheadle and Roberts, the school at Big Bottom became known as "The Abolition School."

Cheadle's work in transporting slaves northward in the underground railroad is reported to have taken place over the span of 20 years and there are a number a local writings which refer to the work of this energetic and unique man. References to Rial Cheadle's activities can be found in Morgan County histories, a pamphlet published by Eck Humphries in 1931, and in first-hand accounts collected by Professor W.H. Seibert of Ohio State University in the late 1880s and 1890s.

It is in an 1892 letter written to Siebert by a Quaker woman named Martha Millions of Pennsville, Ohio, that some insight into the unusual activities of Rial Cheadle is gained. Mrs. Millions reports that Cheadle, first having built a cabin in 1818 or 1820 on the present site of the village of Stockport, Ohio, became a teacher, then engaged himself in "other industries" and eventually became entirely devoted to the work of the Underground Railroad. Mrs. Millions describes Cheadle's unusual talent for making up rhymes and songs which he set to his own music and which he sang as he traveled. Million's reports that upon Cheadle's occasional crossings into Virginia he was regarded by locals as a "harmless imbecile" but "As a result of his visits it is said, the slaves were frequently missing..."

He died in 1867.
