= Jackson Ranch Church =

Historic building in Texas, U.S.

Coordinates: 26.0920°N 98.1838°W

The Jackson Ranch Church also called the Jackson Methodist Church in Hidalgo County, Texas, United States, was established in 1884 from land donated by Martin Jackson, the son of the settlers Matilda and Nathaniel Jackson. Previously, a church was built by the Jackson family of adobe and logs in 1874 or 1875, but it was washed away in a flood. It began as a Methodist Episcopal Church and remained so for fifty years, until the minister retired. After that, it alternatively served as a Methodist and Lutheran Church. There is a cemetery at the church and another cemetery about two blocks away, the Eli Jackson Cemetery which was established in 1865 by Martin's brother Eli.

The land for the church and the two cemeteries came from the Old Jackson Ranch (the original 5,535-acre ranch and farm (2,240 ha) owned by Nathaniel Jackson). The Eli Jackson Cemetery is also called the Eli Jackson-Brewster Cemetery.

The cemeteries were deemed to be of historical significance. The Mexico–United States border wall was projected to go through the cemeteries.

== Church and schoolhouse ==
On February 10, 1884, Martin Jackson donated land to the Board of Missions of the Methodist Episcopal Church for a wood-framed church building that would also be used as a schoolhouse. The lot came from the Jackson Ranch that was established by Martin's parents, Nathaniel and Matilda Jackson. Located a mile from the Rio Grande, it was built with 14 pews for Sunday services, weddings, and funerals.

For fifty years, the church was administered by the Methodist church. When the minister retired, the church was returned to the Jackson family. Over the years since, it has been a Methodist or Lutheran church until 1970. It has been managed by two daughters of Martin. Services were held until 2008 when the chapel was flooded.

== Jackson family cemeteries ==
The family has two cemeteries, with a total of 150 graves, one at the Jackson Ranch Church and another two blocks away. The one-acre Eli Jackson-Brewster Cemetery (0.40 ha), was established in 1865, the year of the death of Eli's father Nathaniel Jackson. Eli and Martin were sons of Nathaniel Jackson.

The Texas Historical Commission certified the Jackson Ranch and Cemetery in 1983 and the Eli Jackson Ranch in 2005. A historical marker at the Eli Jackson Cemetery states of the role of Jackson family members within the community over multiple generations. The church and cemeteries have been often visited by family members and religious leaders, because of its historic role in the history of Texas. The Mexico–United States border wall was begun just a few feet from the Eli Jackson Cemetery, which was named for one of Nathaniel's sons.
