= Silvia and John Webber =

American mixed-race couple

Silvia Hector Webber (1807 – ca. 1892) and John Ferdinand Webber (ca. 1786–1795 – 1882) were a mixed-race couple who were among the initial settlers in Austin's Colony in Travis County, Texas. John, previously a private and a medic during the War of 1812, was the first non-native resident and the founder of Webber's Prairie, where he had established a fort. The town was later named Webberville, Texas. The Webbers secured the freedom of Silvia and their children ultimately by giving up much of their Webberville property. The family was subject to cruel racial prejudice and their children were unable to attend school with white children. The Webbers hired a live-in private tutor.

When the Republic of Texas was founded in 1836, it became a republic that reintroduced legal slavery to Texas and banned free Black people from residing inside its borders. The Webbers were subject to increasingly dangerous persecution and the family became afraid that Silvia and the children could face re-enslavement by Blackbirders.

They moved to Hidalgo County, Texas, by the mid-1850s and settled along the Rio Grande. They are believed to have been conductors on the southern route of the Underground Railroad to Mexico. John smuggled tobacco into Northern Mexico, and during those runs, he may have also helped transport enslaved people to freedom in Mexico. Silvia was particularly known for taking in people in need. The couple also ran a business ferrying people and goods across the Rio Grande from their ranch in Hidalgo County. During the Civil War, the family sided with the United States Army, and two of their sons were captured by the Confederate States Army.

== John Ferdinand Webber ==
John Ferdinand Webber was a white man born in Danville, Vermont between 1786 and 1795. (Note: He was said to have been born January 24, 1786, around 1786, in 1794, or around 1795.) His parents, Hannah Morrill and John Webber, emigrated from Europe to America.

He served from May 23, 1813 to May 31, 1814 as a private and a medic in the War of 1812. He served in the Thirty-first United States Infantry under Captain S. Dickinson and he fought in the battle of Shadage Woods. John arrived in Mexico, San Felipe de Austin, in 1823 seeking to settle. He lived in central Texas for 30 years until 1853, when he moved to Hidalgo County.

== Silvia Hector ==
Silvia Hector was born into slavery in Spanish West Florida (present-day east Louisiana) in 1807. She had been owned by Silas McDaniel in Clark County, Missouri. When she was twelve years old, she was sold to McDaniel's father-in-law, Morgan Cryer, Sr. of Clark County, Arkansas for $550 (~$11,568 in 2025) on March 10, 1819. (Note: During the American Revolutionary War, the Cryers lived on a plantation in South Carolina. They moved to Georgia, which is where Silas McDaniel married the daughter of Morgan Cryer, Sr. They then moved to Spanish West Florida in 1806. The Cryers moved to Arkansas in 1815, which at the time it that region was part of the Missouri Territory. The surname is also spelled Crier in records.)

Silvia likely came to Texas when she was 19 years old in 1826 with John Cryer, who was one of three adult children of Morgan Cryer, Sr. who settled in Mexican Texas. The other two were Kezia Cryer Taylor and Rebecca Cryer Cummins. On March 15, 1826, there were five enslaved people with John Cryer in Austin's register of families. Cryer petitioned for a Mexican land grant as part of Austin's Colony.

== Marriage and children ==
John was among the original settlers of Austin's Colony in Mexican Texas (1821–1836). The colony was established by Stephen F. Austin and Webber lived there beginning in 1826. John was a neighbor and business partner of John Cryer, According to Noah Smithwick (a man who worked and knew both men), Cryer and John were in the business of smuggling tobacco in northern Mexico. He met Silvia at some point between 1826 and 1829 and "became infatuated with her." (Note: He was not her owner.)

John Webber was married to Silvia Hector by 1832, 1834, or an unknown time, by Father Michael Muldoon, according to an affidavit by his widow. Interracial marriage was legal in the Mexican state of Coahuila y Tejas. (Note: In other words, they were either married legally between 1834 and 1836, or they had an unsanctioned religious marriage.) By 1834, while still enslaved, Silvia had given birth to three children with John Webber. As most enslaved women, Silvia experienced a complex relationship with John, a white landowner, and yet, together, Silvia and John negotiated the securing of their three children's freedoms and the freedom of Silvia herself by June 11, 1834. Their first child, Alcy (also known as Elsie) was born in October 1829. Sons Henry and John Webber were born by 1834. (Note: Her name was also spelled Alecy, Alcey, or Elsie.)

Silvia's freedom papers reveal that her owner, John Cryer, did not request payment in specie or land, but requested to receive payment in human beings. He specifically required the Webbers to pay him two young enslaved children, a two-year-old boy and a three-year-old girl. Records found by Dr. Maria Hammack demonstrate that the Webbers did not heed Cryer's request. On the contrary, the Webbers refused to make that payment and by 1850, the Webbers chose to forfeit a large portion of their Webberville property to settle the debt that they owed to Cryer for Silvia and her children's freedoms.

The Webbers had a total of 13 children, two of whom died in infancy. (Note: The University of Texas Rio Grande Valley states that their children include: Elise Webber Jackson (1829 – 1900); Henry Webber (1832 – unknown); John Webber (1834 – unknown); Leonard Webber (1836 – unknown); Sarah Jane Webber Biddy (1838 – 1911); James Morrill Webber (1839 – 1922); Santiago James Webber (c. 1840 - 1920); Nelson/Wilson Webber (1842 – unknown); Sabrina Webber (1848 – unknown); Andrew Webber (1846 – unknown); Rachel Amanda Webber (1851 – 1903); Jeremiah Marcelino Webber (1853 – 1903))

Because the Webber children were not allowed to attend the local school due to racial prejudice, they hired Robert G. McAdoo, a North Carolinian school teacher, to be a live-in tutor for their children.

== Pioneer farmer ==
=== Webber's Prairie ===
John owned 2,214 acres of land that became known as Webber's Prairie. He received the land as a headright on June 22, 1832. It is located near the border of Bastrop and Travis Counties and on the Colorado River. (Note: The African American Registry states that they lived in Well's Prairie, which became Webberville—and it also mentioned that the Webbers lived on Webber's Prairie.) Around 1832, John built Webber's Fort and stockade on the top of a hill. (Note: Remnants of the site include bricks from an old house foundation and a large cistern.) He was the first non-native resident on Webber's Prairie in Travis County, Texas, which was named Webberville after him. The town is on the outskirts of present-day Austin.

Beginning in the 1820s, John traveled to Mexico to sell tobacco. He worked with several partners—John Cryer, Clay Coppedge, and Noah Smithwick—who traveled together to San Fernando, Mexico. He titled himself as Dr. John F. Webber as a front for their key purpose: to surreptitiously sell packets of tobacco.

=== Interracial couple ===
Silvia was the first free black woman to settle in Webberville and one of the first free black persons to settle in Travis County. Initially, they were accepted as an interracial couple, although Silvia was never seen as "an equal" their neighbors at Webberville treated her with respect because they appreciated her kindness. Silvia acquired the nickname Puss and early settlers considered her kind, welcoming and intelligent. Women appreciated her charitable offer of assistance, whatever it may be. She is remembered for taking in and comforting an orphaned child, as well as opening her home to a man disabled with rheumatoid arthritis for years. When white women visited her house, she served them while they ate, but she and her children did not eat with them. When women offered to return the favor, she ate alone in their kitchen.

In 1836, the Republic of Texas was established following the Texas Revolution. Its constitution took away the rights and freedoms that Black people had under Mexican law and outlawed interracial marriage. As more people from the Deep South moved into the area in the 1840s, Silvia and their children experienced "cruel prejudice and discriminatory treatment". The new Webberville settlers wanted to "rid the settlement of its founder and his family of mulato offspring". By the early 1850s the Webbers' lives at Webberville had been threatened and they chose to uproot and move to Mexico.

The Webbers were also afraid that Blackbirders, or slave stealers and slave catchers, would kidnap his family members and sell them into slavery.

=== Along the Rio Grande ===
In 1853, John, Silvia, and their children left Webberville and moved to Hildalgo County. Upon their arrival they were accepted among Mexican American families and relocated to what is now southern Texas near the border of Texas and Mexico near the Rio Grande. They had an 8,856-acre ranch, six miles east of Hidalgo, in what was the Porción Agostadero del Gato land grant. They also established a homestead south of the town of Donna on the banks of the Rio Grande, across the river from Reynosa, Mexico. They established and ran a ferry from their land on Webber's Ranch and across the river to transport goods for their trading business. His cousins—Peter, John, and Andrew Webber—went on trading journeys with him. To assimilate better while trading in Mexico, he changed his name to Juan Fernando Webber. He also bought land from the La Blanca land grant.

== Underground Railroad ==
Silvia and John were anti-slavery advocates and Unionists. They offered a safe haven to freedom seekers bound for Mexico. Silvia was known to be charitable to anyone that needed assistance. She and her family fed and provided shelter and asylum to runaway slaves on the Underground Railroad that led to Mexico. They used their ferry to deliver freedom seekers across the Rio Grande. Their neighbors, Matilda and Nathaniel Jackson also helped people escape slavery.

== Civil War ==
Unlike most of their neighbors, the Webbers were sympathetic to the Union Army during the Civil War. The Confederate States Army occupied the Rio Grande Valley and they were persecuted for their position against the Confederacy and were driven off their land.

According to Colonel John Salmon Ford, the Webbers "closed the doors [on his soldiers] and refused admission until [Colonel] Ford came". Confederate troops captured two of John's sons. One of the Webber men escaped and went to Fort Brown to notify the Union Army soldiers that Ford had 60 soldiers. The family fled to Mexico and did not return until May 1865 at the end of the war or in 1882 before John's death.

== Later years and death ==
In 1872, John received a pension from the United States. He died on July 19, 1882, in his home. He was buried in the Webber Cemetery in Hidalgo County, near Donna, Texas. Silvia died around 1891 or 1892.

== Legacy ==
- The Webbers helped establish Webberville in Bastrop County and Donna in Hidalgo County, Texas.
- A memorial for John Ferdinand Webber is located at the Webber's family cemetery off of US 281, near the Donna Pumping Station, in Hidalgo County. 26°4′18.77″N 98°6′10.56″W

== Bibliography ==
- Smithwick, Noah (1983). The Evolution of a State or Recollections of Old Texas Days (1st ed.). Austin, Texas: San Felipe Press. pp. 115–119.
