= Matilda and Nathaniel Jackson =

American interracial couple

Matilda Hicks (born c. 1801) and Nathaniel Jackson (1798–1865) were an interracial couple who helped fleeing enslaved people between 1859 and 1865. They offered a safe-haven and a ferry ride across the Rio Grande into Mexico. They were driven by their religious and anti-slavery beliefs. It is said they helped anyone in need.

There are no records that show that Matilda was ever freed. Records do show that Nathaniel's family bought Matilda as a child, and that he inherited her at some point. Matilda and Nathaniel, however, had seven children while in Alabama, all who were born enslaved by Nathaniel and his family. Together they moved to Texas in 1859 because the family was subject to racial prejudice there. The Census of 1860 presents Matilda as a 59 year-old "House Servant" born in Georgia living with Matthew (Nathaniel) Jackson in Hidalgo County, Texas.

In 1859, Jackson, Matilda and the children left Alabama for Mexico. They never made it to Mexico but instead, settled on the northern side of the Rio Grande in what is today Hidalgo County, Texas. They operated a ranch where they raised cattle, sheep, and goats. They grew cotton, sugar cane, and vegetables. Nathaniel traded at a market in Rio Grande City, Texas and across the river in Mexico.

Two of their sons—Martin and Eli—established Jackson Ranch Church and two cemeteries, which have been designated for their historical significance.

== Early life in Alabama ==
Born in 1798 in Georgia, Nathaniel Jackson was the son of Mary Burk and Joseph Jackson, a Quaker. His father owned a plantation, relying on the labor of enslaved people. Nathaniel was raised in Alabama.

He developed a relationship with Matilda Hicks, an enslaved woman on the Jackson's plantation. She was born around 1801. Their first child was born around 1829. In 1840 and 1850, Nathaniel lived in Wilcox, Alabama. In 1840, he had nine enslaved people, five of whom were agricultural laborers. Ten years later, he had 22 enslaved people. (Note: In 1850, he had 22 enslaved people, 15 of whom ranged in age from six months to 18. There were three women in their 20s and two men in his 20s. There was a woman age 50 and a man age 49.)

Jackson inherited property in Georgia and owned 720 acres in Alabama. On February 13, 1857, he sold the estate in Alabama. By this time, he and Matilda had grown children—Lucinda, Eli, Bryant, Columbus, Matilda, Martin, and John—and grandchildren. Nathaniel had three step-daughters. (Note: Either his wife Matilda had daughters from another relationship, or he was first married to a widow with three daughters. There is an unsubstantiated statement that his first wife was a widow with three daughters and was of Cherokee and French descent. (It may be a confusion with a person with the same name.))

New laws, such as the Fugitive Slave Act of 1850, did not provide any protection for free black people who could be captured by slave hunters and forced into slavery. Concerned about the safety of his family, the Jacksons left Alabama, planning to settle in Mexico where slavery was banned.

== Pioneers in Texas ==
In 1859, Matilda, Nathaniel, and their adult children traveled in covered wagons to the Rio Grande Valley of Texas where they would be freer to live as an interracial family. They traveled with five families, which included eleven black freedmen. Their daughter Lucinda and her husband did not move to Texas.

When they arrived in the Rio Grande Valley, they settled nearby another mixed-race couple Silvia and John Webber and decided to stay in Texas. Along the border, the population was a mixture of ethnic backgrounds, including African Americans and people of Native American, Spanish and Mexican descent.

In South Texas they bought 5,535 acres (Note: The Atlas: Texas Historical Commission states that it was 5,500 acres.) of the Porción 71 tract of Porción Agostadero del Gato, a former Spanish land grant. The property had a .7 mile river frontage. It became known as the Jackson Rancho.

The ranch was located between Fort Brown and Fort Ringgold near the Military Highway. During their initial years on the ranch, there were times that the Jacksons sought refuge in Brownsville due to raids by Native Americans.

In 1860, Nathaniel and Matilda lived on the ranch with their sons Eli, Columbus, and John. Living with them in a cluster were the families of Emily, Martin, Brant, Matilda, and Nancy Jackson. With them were Louis Hicks (b. ca. 1802) and his wife. There were a total of seven Jackson-Hicks families with 39 adults and children. They were surrounded by unoccupied land. (Note: Perhaps Emily and Nancy were two of his step-daughters.)

The Jacksons ran a cattle ranch and farm, where they grew sugar cane, cotton, and vegetables. They also raised sheep and goats. Nathaniel's brand was NJ. Nathaniel had a market in what is now Rio Grande City, Texas (about 50 miles west of the ranch). The Jacksons also engaged in trade across the Rio Grande, transporting goods and people across the river in their ferry.

Each year, Nathaniel and Matilda Hicks Jackson hosted a "Revival" after the harvest. Temporary homes were built for visitors. It sometimes lasted for two weeks. Jackson was a religious man who read the Bible and prayed every morning. (Note: The African American Registry states that Nathaniel established the area's first Methodist church, which was originally an adobe structure, but the first Jackson Ranch Church was built in 1774 or 1775—and it was built of adobe.)

== Underground Railroad ==
The Jacksons offered safe haven to refugee blacks and Native Americans. Their ranch was also a settlement for African Americans. They are believed to have been conductors on the southern Underground Railroad, called the Slave Pathways in Texas, offering food, shelter, and safe passage into Mexico. Not everyone who came to the Jackson Ranch crossed the Rio Grande. Some stayed with the Jacksons to work on the ranch and settled in the Rio Grande Valley.

The Jacksons lived near Silvia and John Webber who also helped people escape slavery from the Deep South and Texas. Like the Webbers, the Jacksons had their own licensed ferry across the Rio Grande.

More enslaved people sought freedom during the Civil War.

== Later years and death ==
Although there are no records, it is thought that during the Civil War, Nathaniel and Martin Jackson may have been Unionists when Confederate and Union soldiers engaged in battle in the valley in 1863 and 1864. This is however disputed by the National Park Service given that the only Union soldier identified with the last name of "Jackson" in South Texas was a man from Louisville, Kentucky whose name was "Jackson Martin" and not actually "Martin Jackson" from Hidalgo's Jackson Ranch.

Nathaniel died in 1865 and was interred in the family cemetery established by his son Eli that year. The ranch was divided up among six natural children, the widower of Lucinda, and his wife Matilda.
