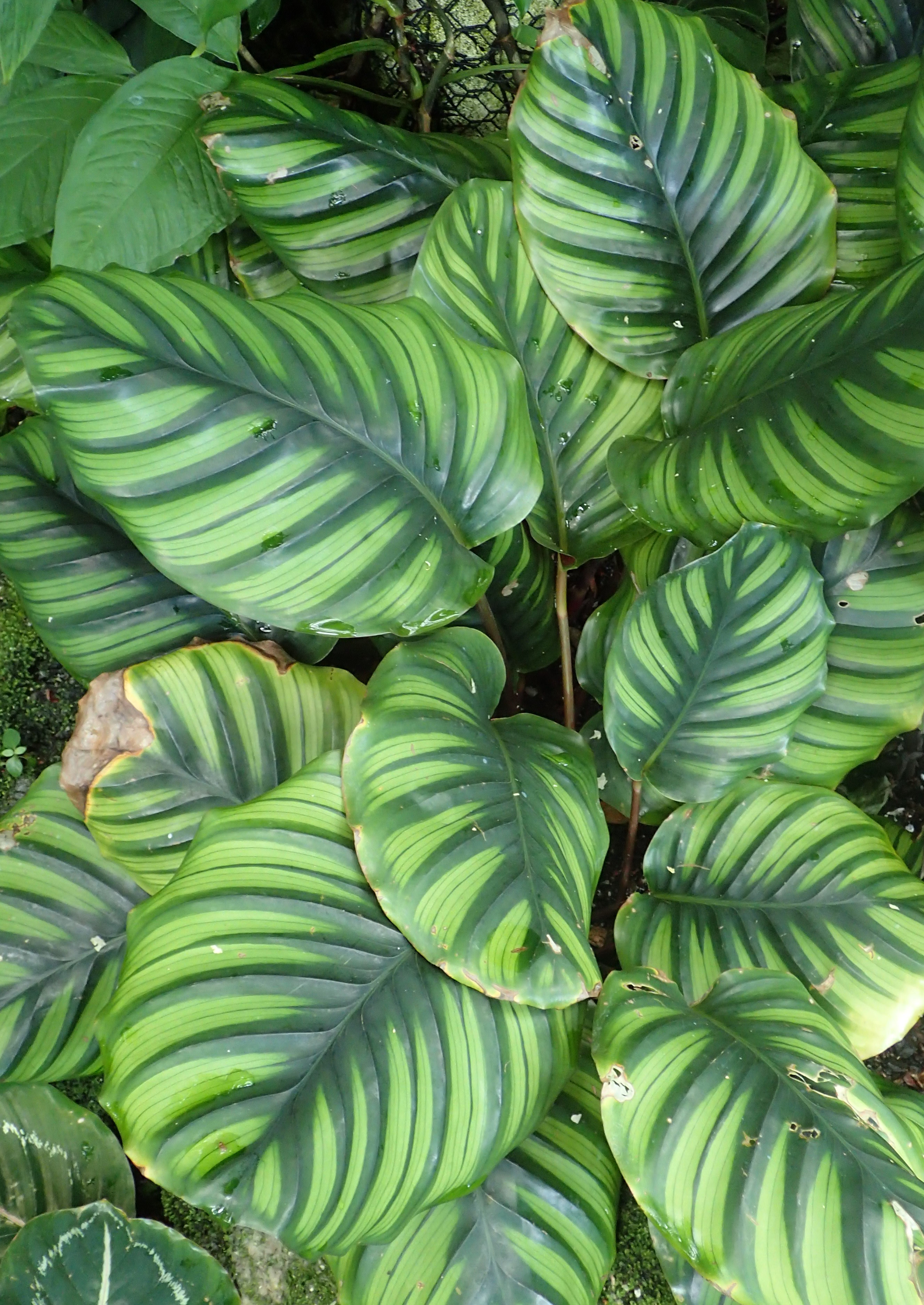
- Goeppertia fasciata 'Borrusica'
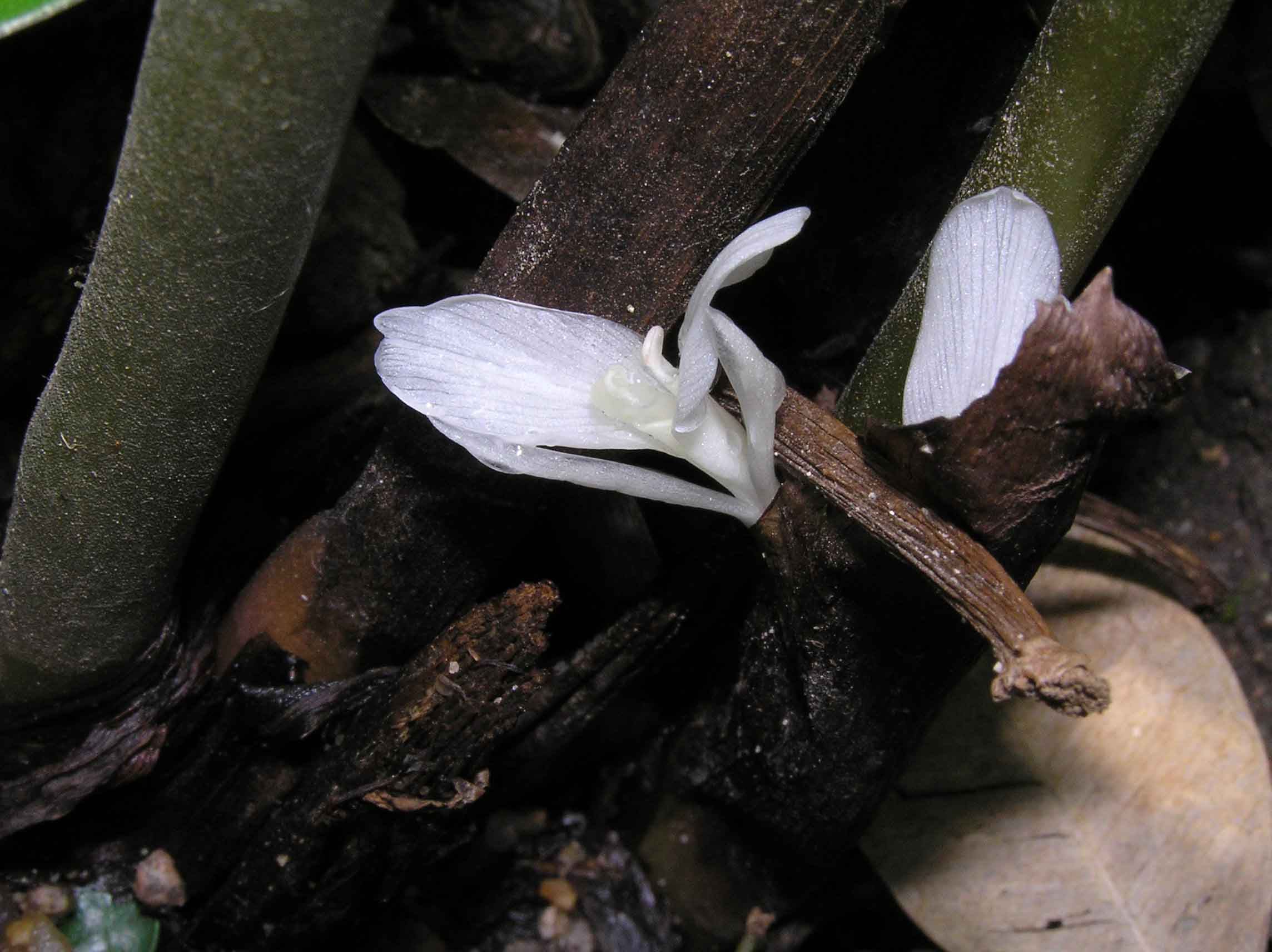
- Flower

Scientific classification
- Kingdom: Plantae
- Clade: Tracheophytes
- Clade: Angiosperms
- Clade: Monocots
- Clade: Commelinids
- Order: Zingiberales
- Family: Marantaceae
- Genus: Goeppertia
- Species: G. fasciata

Binomial name
- Goeppertia fasciata (Linden ex K.Koch) Borchs. & S.Suárez

Synonyms
- Calathea fasciata (Linden ex K.Koch) Regel & Körn.; Calathea rotundifolia var. fasciata (Linden ex K.Koch) Petersen; Maranta borussica Linden; Maranta fasciata Linden ex K.Koch; Phyllodes fasciata (Linden ex K.Koch) Kuntze

= Goeppertia fasciata =

Species of plant

Goeppertia fasciata (syn. Calathea fasciata), is a species of flowering plant in the family Marantaceae. Native to wet tropical areas of northeastern Brazil, it is occasionally kept as a houseplant. There appears to be a cultivar, 'Borrusica'.

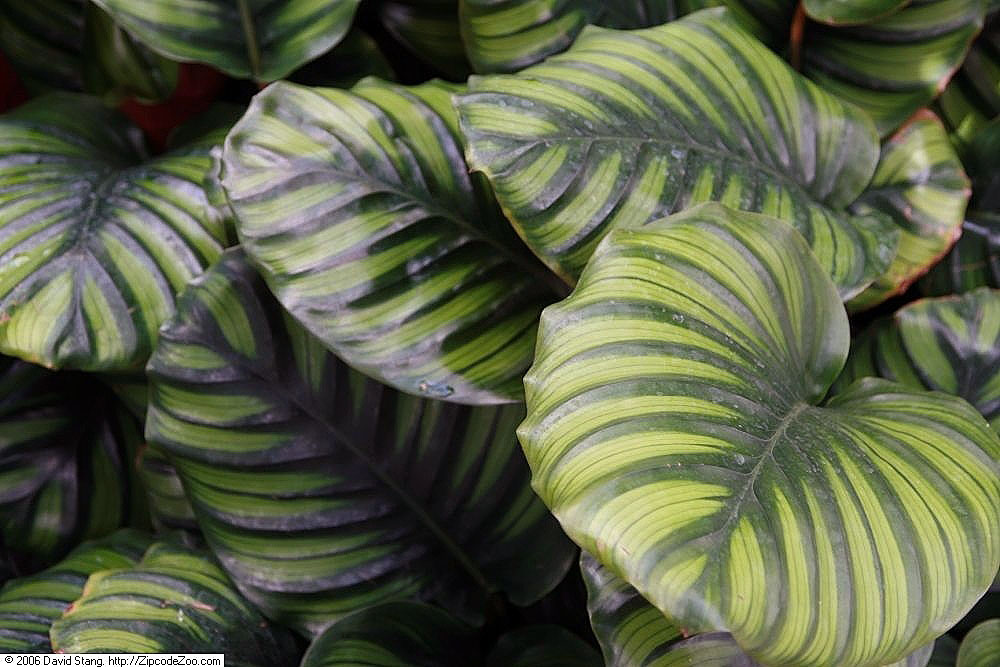
At the United States Botanic Garden
