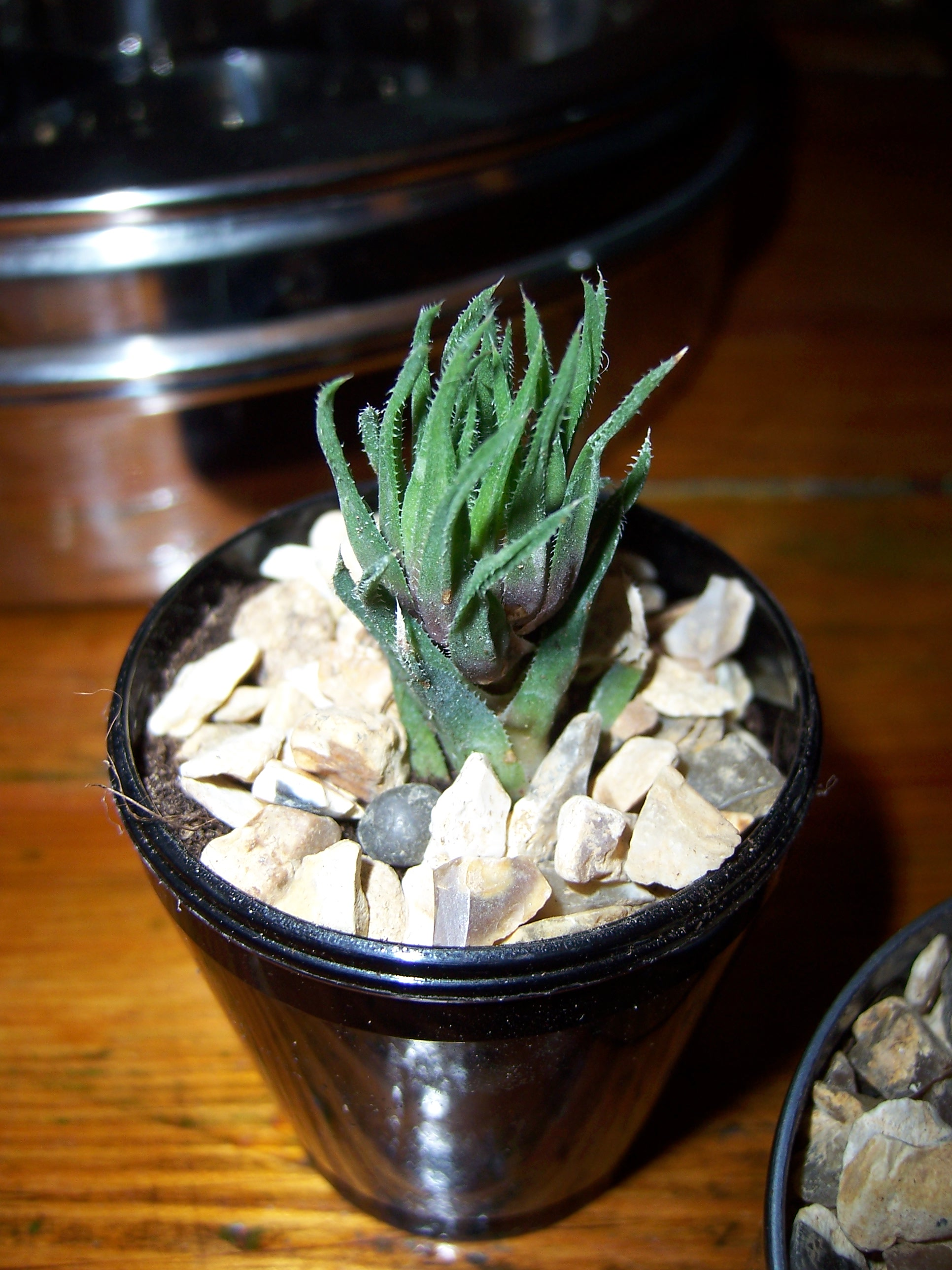
- Haworthia angustifolia var. albanensis in culture.

Scientific classification
- Kingdom: Plantae
- Clade: Tracheophytes
- Clade: Angiosperms
- Clade: Monocots
- Order: Asparagales
- Family: Asphodelaceae
- Subfamily: Asphodeloideae
- Genus: Haworthia
- Species: H. angustifolia

Binomial name
- Haworthia angustifolia Haw.

= Haworthia angustifolia =

Species of flowering plant

Haworthia angustifolia is a species of Haworthia from the eastern Cape Province. It is an evergreen succulent plant with short leaves arranged in rosettes of 8 cm in diameter. The leaves, about 20, are upright, acuminate and lanceolate, 3–6 cm long and 6–12 mm wide.

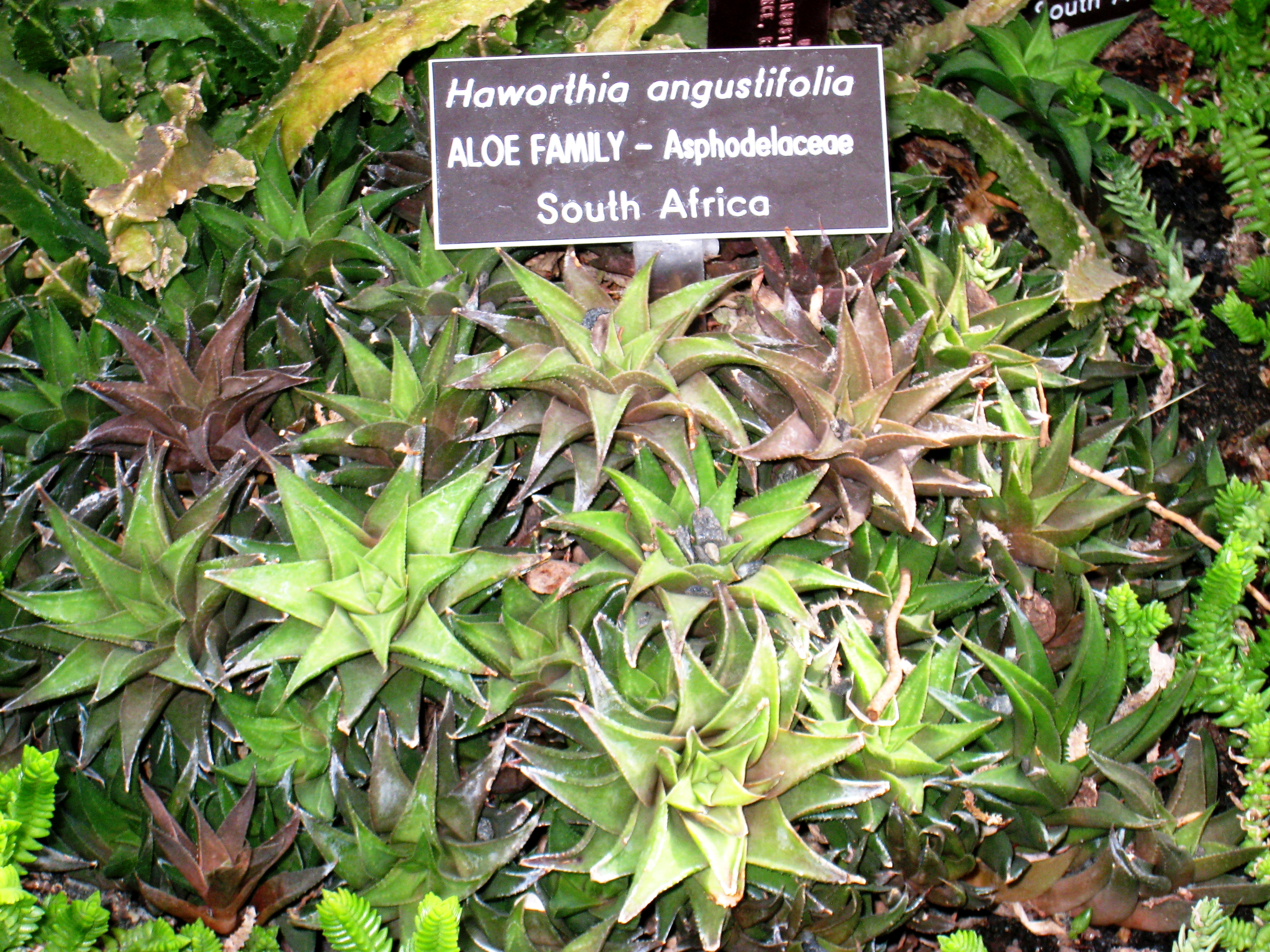
A large clump in the United States Botanic Garden, Washington DC.
