= Jonathan Walker (abolitionist) =

American abolitionist (1799–1878)

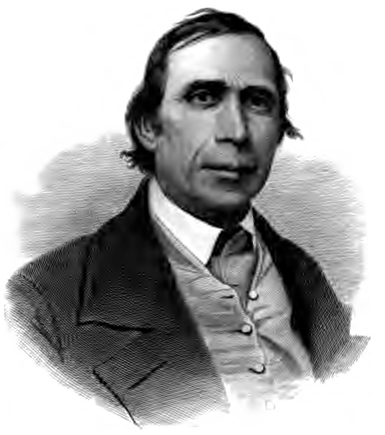
- Jonathan Walker in 1848 from an engraving in the book, Trial and imprisonment of Jonathan Walker: at Pensacola, Florida, for aiding slaves to escape from bondage, published by the Massachusetts Anti-Slavery Society in Boston.
- Born: 1799; Harwich, Massachusetts, US
- Died: May 1, 1878 (aged 77–78)
- Other name: The Man with the Branded Hand
- Occupations: Reformer, fisherman, railroad worker
- Known for: Arrested for helping runaway slaves

Jonathan Walker (1799 – May 1, 1878), known as "The Man with the Branded Hand", was an American fishing ship captain and abolitionist who became a national hero in 1844 when he was tried and sentenced as a slave stealer following his attempt to help seven runaway slaves find freedom. He was branded on his hand by the United States Government with the markings "S S", for "Slave Stealer".

== Biography ==
Jonathan Walker was born in Harwich, Massachusetts in 1799. During his youth in Massachusetts, Walker learned to sail and became captain of a fishing vessel. In early 1837, he went to Florida and became a railroad contractor. The condition of the slaves interested him, and in 1844 Walker aided several of them as they attempted to make escape in an open boat from the coast of Florida to the British West Indies, where slavery had been abolished ten years before. After doubling the capes, Captain Walker fell seriously ill; the crew, being ignorant of navigation, would all have been drowned if a wrecking sloop had not rescued them and taken Walker to Key West. From there, he was sent in chains aboard USS General Taylor to Pensacola, where he was put in prison, chained to the floor, and deprived of light and proper food. Walker later wrote about the degrading conditions inside the jailhouse and the brutality shown toward slaves there.

Put on trial in federal court in Pensacola, Walker was convicted, heavily fined, and sentenced to be tied to a pillory, and publicly branded on his right hand with the letters "S S" (for "slave stealer"). But to sympathizers, it meant "Slave Savior". United States Marshal Eben Dorr, who also traded slaves, executed the branding with a hot iron.

Walker confined in the pillory

Branding of Walker's hand

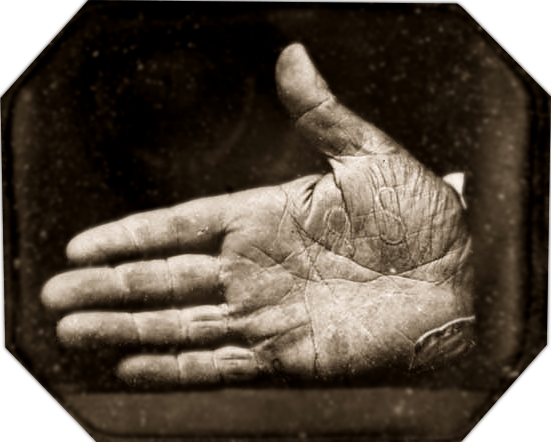
1845 daguerreotype of Walker's branded hand by photographers Southworth & Hawes.

Walker was then returned to jail, confined eleven months, and released only after Northern abolitionists paid his fine. For five years after his release, Walker lectured on slavery in the Northern and Western states. For instance, in 1847/48, he was on a four-and-a-half-month lecture tour together with John S. Jacobs.

Walker – along with Stephen Symonds Foster and Abby Kelley Foster, Sojourner Truth, Marius Robinson, and Sallie Holley – reorganized the Michigan Anti-Slavery Society in 1853 in Adrian, Michigan. The state society was founded in 1836 in Ann Arbor, Michigan.

He lived in Wisconsin in 1855 and 1860 near Winooski, Wisconsin. He moved to Michigan around 1866 and lived near Muskegon.

Jonathan Walker died on May 1, 1878, in Lake Harbor near Norton Shores, Michigan. He is buried at Evergreen Cemetery in Muskegon. His wife Jane Gage Walker (1803–1871) is buried at Norton Cemetery, Norton Shores, Michigan. Their two youngest sons (born in 1843 and 1848) predeceased their parents, but two sons and five daughters survived both parents.

== Legacy ==
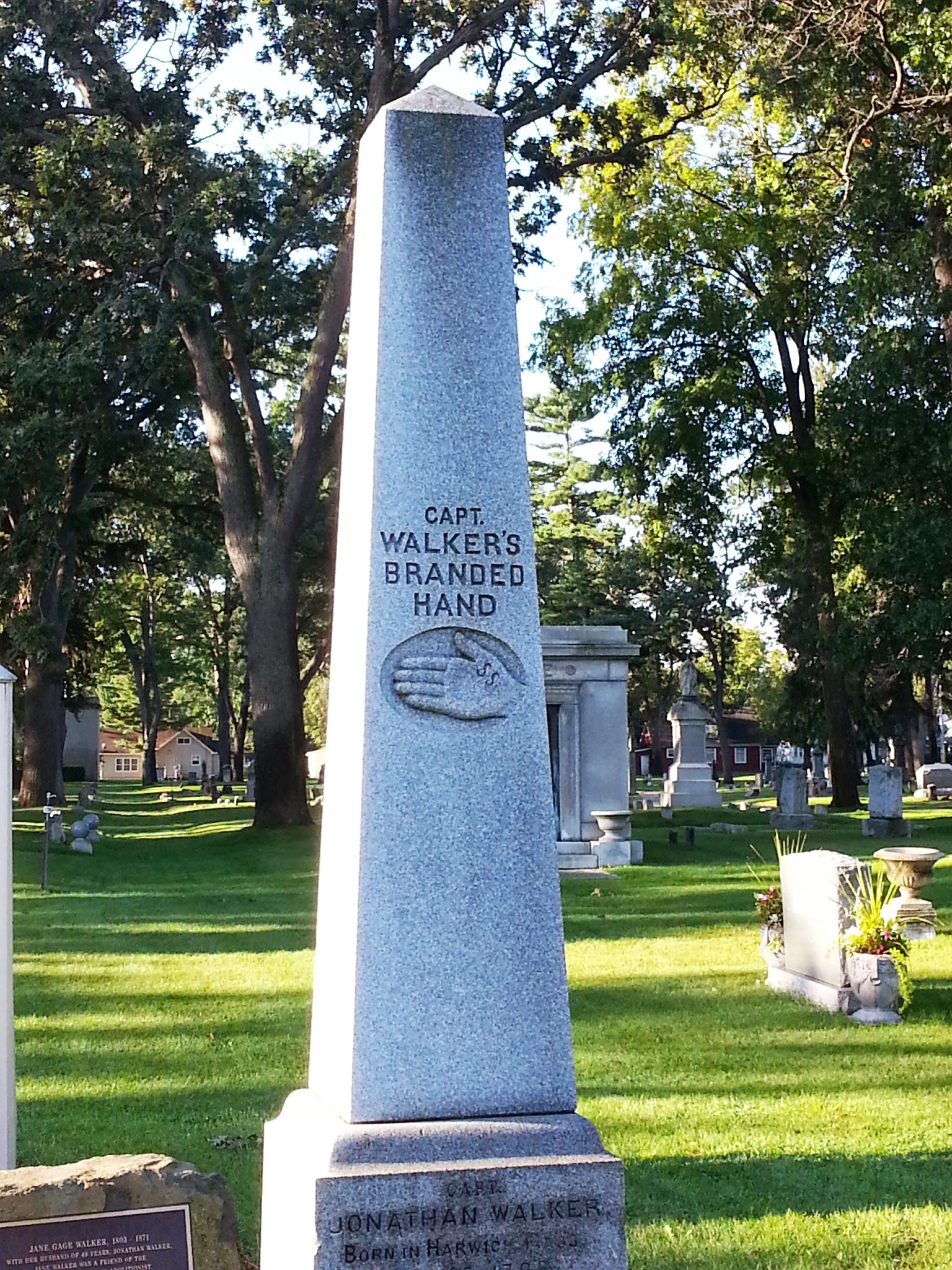
Walker's memorial, with an engraving of his branded hand

A monument was erected to Captain Walker's memory on August 1, 1878. The monument was funded by philanthropist and abolitionist Photius Fisk, who funded several monuments dedicated to abolitionists. The monument became a national shrine for those working towards racial justice.

Walker was the subject of John Greenleaf Whittier's poem "The Branded Hand". Whittier learned about Walker by reading a book about him called Trial and Imprisonment of Jonathan Walker (1850). The poem praised Walker's actions.

A plaque commemorating Walker was erected on the lawn next to the Harwich, Massachusetts, Historical Society. Another Rev. John Walker (1786–1845) was a Presbyterian minister and abolitionist in Pennsylvania and Ohio who founded Franklin College in Ohio.

In 2013, Walker was inducted into the National Abolition Hall of Fame, in Peterboro, New York.

== See also ==
- Kidnapping into slavery in the United States
- John Murrell (bandit) – Antebellum American criminal (died 1844)
- Underground Railroad – Network for fugitive slaves in 19th-century U.S.
