= The Free South =

The Free South was an abolitionist newspaper which was printed in Kentucky by William Shreve Bailey from 1858 to 1866. Bailey was from Centerville, Ohio and moved down to Newport, Kentucky to find work which he found as a cotton machinist and engine builder and in his spare time wrote into Newport News, a small local paper. The Free South began in Newport, Kentucky with the help of Baileys wife and 14 children by his side. It was Kentucky's only abolitionist newspaper in the 1850s. On October 28, 1859, a pro-slavery mob threw his printing presses and typewriters into the street. He then resettled in Cincinnati, Ohio. After his wife passed in 1867 Bailey moved on to Nashville, Tennessee to continue his publishing business and died at the age of 80.
