= William Shreve Bailey =

American mechanic and printer

William Shreve Bailey (c. 1806–1886) was an American mechanic and printer born in Centerville, Ohio and who moved to Newport, Kentucky, notable for his abolitionist publications, and who received widespread support from the abolitionist movement when financially strained due effects of his work.

== Abolitionist ==
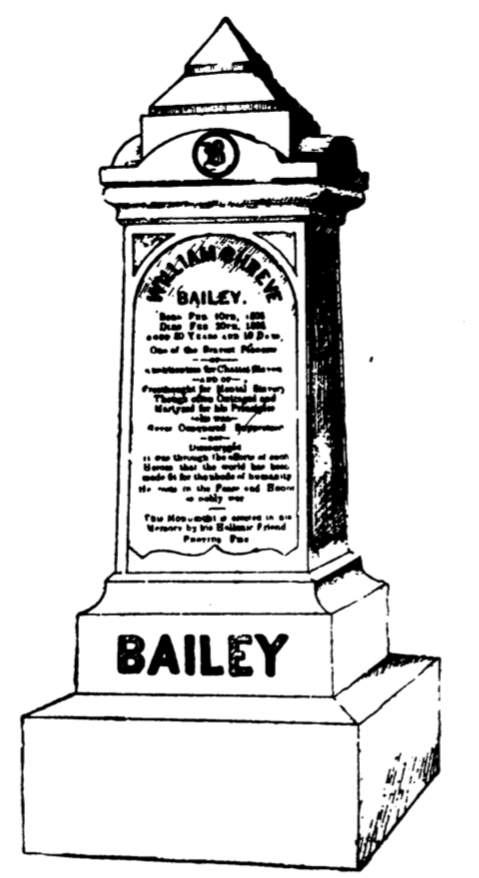
William Shreve Bailey Monument

Bailey was by trade a cotton machinist and steam engine builder and had established a machine shop in Newport. His religious disposition led him to abolitionism, and he contributed articles to the Newport News before buying the publication at the urging of its current owner, who felt himself unable to cope with harassment arising out of printing an abolitionist message in a slave-owning state.

Bailey published a number of other newspapers, including the Kentucky Weekly News (1851–1858) and The Free South (1858–1866). His printing presses were destroyed by pro-slavers on two occasions, in 1851 and 1859. He received financial support from anti-slavery campaigners in the US and the UK, and was sponsored to make an abolitionist speaking tour in 1860.

Bailey, and more particularly Laura Bailey, was the focus of Little Laura, the Kentucky Abolitionist, an 1859 tract by Anna Richardson which described the short life of Laura as she assisted her father's publishing effort before dying at the age of 10, and which goes on to describe the financial hardships of the Bailey family. The tract was written with a view to encouraging children to encourage their parents to donate to the anti-slavery cause.

Photius Fisk funded many abolitionists. Bailey was one of them. In the 1860s he gave him a sizable donation for his abolitionist activities. He continued funding his newspaper activities well after the Civil War. Bailey and Fisk were friends. When Bailey died, Photius Fisk paid to erect a monument in his honor.
