= USS General Taylor =

Tugboat of the United States Navy

History
- Name: USS General Taylor
- Namesake: U.S. General Zachary Taylor
- Completed: 1840?
- Acquired: By War Dept.: 1840; By Navy: 1842
- Commissioned: 1842–1852
- Refit: Rebuilt and re-engined, 1846
- Fate: Sold 1852

General characteristics
- Type: Tugboat/Despatch vessel
- Tonnage: 150 tons
- Length: 105 ft (32 m)
- Beam: 17 ft 6 in (5.33 m)
- Draft: 6 ft 6 in (1.98 m)
- Depth of hold: 8 ft 6 in (2.59 m)
- Propulsion: 1 × 25.3 in bore, 6 ft stroke single-cylinder square crosshead steam engine; 2 × 16 ft diameter sidewheels
- Speed: 8–9 knots; after refit, 8–9.5 knots
- Armament: 1849: 1 × 6-pdr cannon

USS General Taylor was a small sidewheel steamer which served in the U.S. Navy from 1842 to 1852. Prior to her Navy service, she operated as a transport and supply vessel during the Second Seminole War.

Though only an auxiliary ship, General Taylor appears to have had quite a colorful career. After her Seminole War service, she played a cameo role in the notorious trial and sentencing of abolitionist Jonathan Walker. In the mid-1840s, General Taylor's crew included two future Engineers-in-Chief of the Navy. After being burned and rebuilt in 1846, the steamer later played a role in the foiling of a planned 1849 filibuster invasion of Cuba. General Taylor was sold by the Navy in 1852.

== Design and construction ==
General Taylor had a length of 105 feet (32 m), a beam of 17 feet 6 inches (5.33 m), a draft of 6 feet 6 inches (1.98 m) and a hold depth of 8 feet 6 inches (2.59 m).

General Taylor's original builder is not known, but her original engine was supplied by the Allaire Iron Works of New York. The single-cylinder, 98 hp, 23 rpm engine was of the square crosshead type, with a 25.3 inch bore and 6-foot stroke. Steam was supplied by an iron flue boiler at an average working pressure of 20 psi. The paddlewheels were 16 feet in diameter and 4 feet 10 inches wide, with fourteen 1-foot 10-inch width paddles. The vessel had an average speed of 8 and a maximum speed of 9 knots.

== Service history ==
General Taylor was purchased at New York by the War Department in 1840 and was used as a transport and supply ship during the Second Seminole War in Florida. She was transferred to the Navy in 1842, and used for a time in the Gulf of Mexico.

In July 1844, General Taylor was used to convey abolitionist Jonathan Walker from Key West to the Pensacola Navy Yard, where he was handed over to local authorities and charged with slave stealing. Walker later testified that for most of the voyage aboard General Taylor, in spite of being seriously ill, he was kept chained hand and foot in "filthy" and oppressively hot conditions in or near the engine room of the steamer's hold, apart from brief periods of a few hours a day when he was allowed on deck. Walker was later infamously sentenced by a Florida civil court to having the letters "S.S."—an acronym for "Slave Stealer"—branded on his hand.

In 1845, General Taylor was converted into a tugboat, operating out of the Pensacola Navy Yard. Benjamin F. Isherwood, later Engineer-in-Chief of the Navy during the American Civil War, served on General Taylor in 1846–47. William H. Shock, Engineer-in-Chief of the Navy in the 1870s, also served on General Taylor in the late 1840s.

On 10 October 1846, General Taylor caught fire while lying at the wharf of the Pensacola Navy Yard, and was burned to the water's edge. She was redesigned by F. Grice and rebuilt by G. Lyndal of Baltimore, a new engine and boiler being supplied at the same time by Charles Reeder & Sons of the same city. The new 187 hp engine was of the crosshead type, with a 36-inch bore, 6-foot stroke and steam cut-off of 3 feet. The new boiler had a greater fire surface area (720 vs. 499 square feet) than the original, and a slightly higher operating pressure of 25 psi. The paddlewheel diameter was also enlarged by a foot, and the number of paddles reduced by one to thirteen. The new machinery appears to have been less efficient than the original, consuming twice the fuel for only a one-half knot increase in maximum speed. General Taylor's hull dimensions remained the same after the rebuild as before.

In September 1849, General Taylor was despatched to Round Island, Mississippi, to help monitor a party of 500 or more "adventurers" gathered there, whose leaders were rumored to be planning an attack on Cuba. General Taylor was selected for the mission because her light draft was expected to enable her to negotiate the shallow approaches to the Island, while her speed would allow her to effectively pursue any ships attempting to embark the adventurers.

For the operation, General Taylor was equipped with a single 6-pounder cannon, and her crew issued with small arms. In the event, these precautions proved unnecessary as the men on the island eventually dispersed peacefully. The men had been in the pay of Narciso López, a Venezuelan filibuster. Lopez would later organize two further attempts to invade Cuba; on the last attempt he was captured and executed by the Spanish.

General Taylor was employed as a dispatch vessel at the Navy Yard until April 1852, when, needing extensive repairs, she was sold at public auction at Pensacola for $3,000. Her fate thereafter is unknown.

== Bibliography ==
- Burnett, Gene (1996): Florida's Past: People and Events That Shaped the State, Volume 1, p. 141, Pineapple Press, ISBN 978-1-56164-115-4.
- Dixon, Joan M. (2006): National Intelligencer Newspaper Abstracts: 1846, p. 472, Heritage Books Inc., ISBN 978-0-7884-4072-4.
- Chapman, Maria Weston (Ed.) (1846): Interesting Memoirs And Documents Relating To American Slavery, pp. 191-222, J. Barker, Leeds, England.
- Emmons, Lieut. George F., USN (1853): The Navy of the United States, From the Commencement, 1775 to 1853; With a Brief History of Each Vessel's Service and Fate as Appears Upon Record, pp. 30-35, Government Printing Office, Washington.
- Hamersly, Lewis R. (1878): The Records of Living Officers of the U.S. Navy and Marine Corps, 3rd Edition, pp. 328-329, J. B. Lippincott & Co., Philadelphia; reprinted by Applewood Books, Massachusetts, ISBN 978-1-4290-2135-7.
- Message of the President of the United States, Transmitting Reports from the several Heads of Department relative to the subject of the Resolution of the Senate of the 23rd of May, as to alleged revolutionary movements in Cuba, 31st Congress, 1st Session [Senate], Ex. Doc. 57, 1850, p. 80.
