= John Sykes Fayette =

American minister and abolitionist (1810–1876)

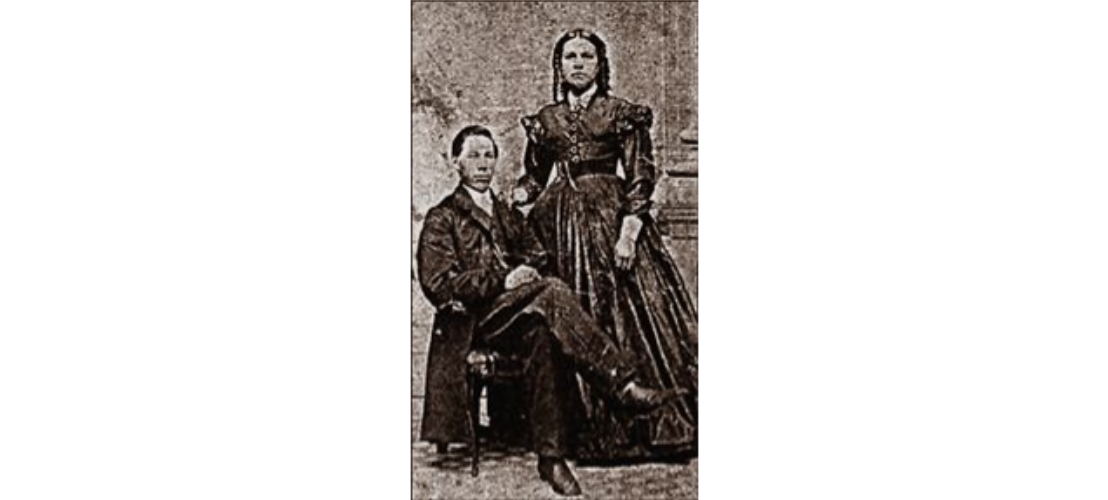
- Born: c. 1810
- Died: Feb 27, 1876 (aged 66); London, Ontario, Canada
- Resting place: Oakland Cemetery, London, Ontario, Canada; 41.24530°N 81.43920°W
- Known for: First African American college graduate in Ohio
- Spouses: Hudson (m. 1837–1837) Emily Preston (m. 1838) Elizabeth Bartlett Forbes (before 1876)
- Children: 2

Rev. John Frederick Augustus Sykes Fayette (c. 1810 – February 27, 1876) was an American and Canadian college-educated Presbyterian minister. Fayette attended Western Reserve College, present day Case Western Reserve University, beginning in 1832 and graduated in 1836, notably as Ohio's first African American college student.

== Early life and education ==
Fayette arrived in Hudson, Ohio, via New York City, when his minister, Rev. Samuel Hanson Cox of Laight Street Presbyterian Church, wrote a letter of recommendation to President Charles Backus Storrs of Western Reserve College. In 1832, Fayette became the first African American to enroll at a university in Ohio and west of the Appalachian Mountains. In 1836, John Sykes Fayette became the first African American to graduate from a university in Ohio and west of the Appalachian Mountains. Staying for another year, Fayette earned a graduate degree in divinity, graduating again in 1837.

As a participating Abolitionist, Fayette spent time associating with local Hudson resident John Brown.

== Presbyterian ministries ==
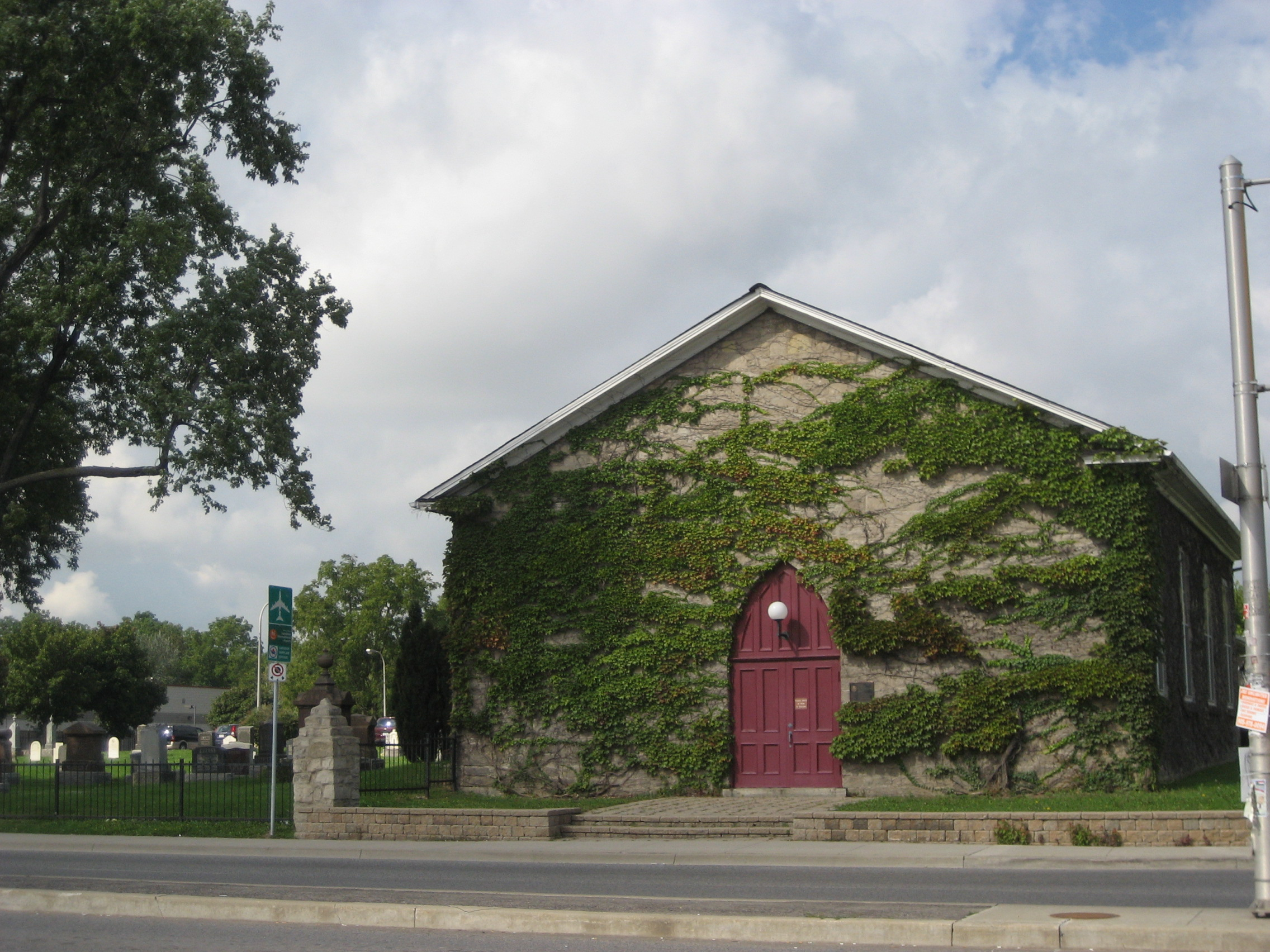
Barton Stone Church in Hamilton, Ontario, constructed from 1845 to 1847. Rev. Fayette was minister from 1845 to 1850.

Often described as an "educated mulatto", Fayette moved to Canada in 1839 after being licensed by the Cleveland Presbytery. In 1840, he founded the "Wellington Institute" in the Waterloo region of Berlin, Ontario (known today as Kitchener, Ontario), teaching local and Mennonite children for two years. A couple notable names who attended the school included Jacob Yost Shantz and Israel D. Bowman. The Institute did not attract enough students to make ends meet, and closed after two years.

Fayette was finally licensed in Canada by the Presbytery of Niagara. He then became a minister for several Presbyterian congregations, first in Ancaster in 1844 and then at Barton Stone Church from 1845 to 1850. The church, which still stands in Hamilton, Ontario, was completed in 1847. Other places Fayette served as minister included St. Vincent, New Tecumseth, and Watford.

Fayette died on February 27, 1876, in London, Ontario, and was buried in Oakland Cemetery next to his third wife Elizabeth Bartlett Forbes.

== See also ==
- List of African-American pioneers in desegregation of higher education
