= Photius Fisk =

Greek-American statesman and botanist (1809–1890)

Chaplain Photius Fisk
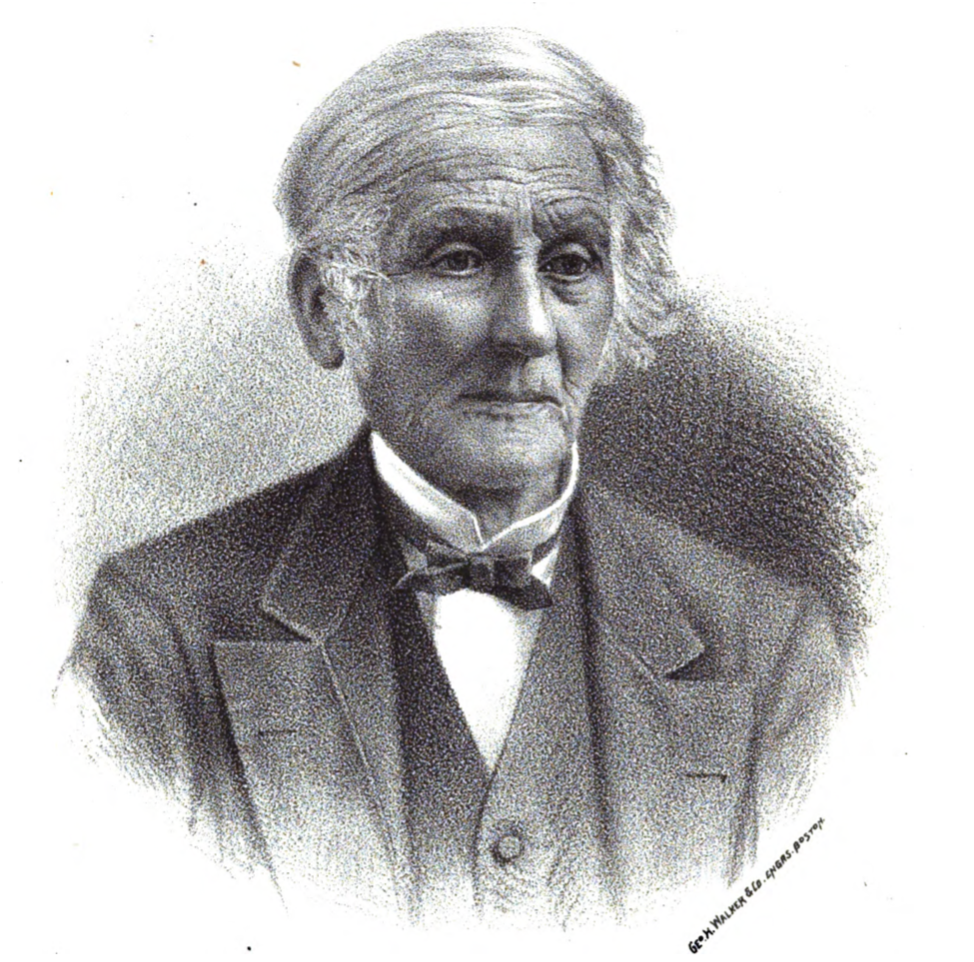

Personal details
- Born: January 1809 Hydra, Ottoman Greece
- Died: February 4, 1890 (aged 80–81) Boston, Mass, U.S.
- Resting place: Cedar Grove Cemetery, Dorchester, Massachusetts
- Known for: Philanthropist; Botanist; Abolitionist; Presbyterian minister

Military service
- Allegiance: United States of America
- Branch/service: United States Navy
- Years of service: 1842–1864
- Rank: Chaplain

Photius Fisk (Greek: Φώτιος Καβασάλης Φισκ; January 1807/1809 – February 4, 1890), also known as Photius Kavasales or Kavasalis, was a Greek-American statesman, botanist, philanthropist, clergyman, abolitionist, and civil rights activist. He is known for lobbying to end flogging in the U.S. Navy. Congress officially passed the law in 1850. The legislation was particularly beneficial to slaves working in the U.S. Navy. Fisk funded countless abolitionist causes and erected several monuments for abolitionists. He had a saffron or bronze complexion. Photius dedicated his life to the poor and destitute.

== Early life ==
Photius Kavasalis Fisk was born on the island of Hydra. At an early age, his family moved to Smyrna where his father was employed as an accountant in a mercantile house. Around 1814, a plague wiped out most of the Kavasalis family. His father, mother, two brothers, and two sisters were all dead. Photius was also infected with the plague but recovered. Photius moved to Malta to live with his older brother Athanasius. In 1821, the Greek War of Independence began. Photius was about thirteen years old. His brother Athanasius joined the Greek revolution and fought in many battles.

During the summer of 1822, Kavasalis met American Missionary Pliny Fisk. Kavasalis was living with his uncle Panages Maneses. Kavasalis decided he wanted to become a missionary. His uncle consulted a local priest and wanted a full explanation of the biblical study his nephew would learn in America. The orthodox priest also inquired about the educational practices of the missionaries. The priest John Karavelles decided to send his son Anastasius with Kavasalis. Photius was instructed that he could not marry. Both boys boarded a ship called the America in Malta. They spoke Greek, Italian, and Maltese. Neither spoke English.

The boys arrived in the United States on George Washington's Birthday February 22, 1823. The children traveled throughout New England and saw the most majestic churches. When they arrived in Boston they met many Americans of distinction. They also met Ex-President John Quincy Adams. Both of the young men were sent to a mission school in Cornwall, Connecticut. They were instructed by Mr. Daggett the principal of the school. They learned basic English. Both of the boys were young and far away from home. The young men met the governor of Connecticut Oliver Wolcott Jr. He invited them to his house on their next vacation. Deacon Loomis told Photius and Anastasius they could not travel to the Governor's house because they had to plow the fields over summer vacation. They lived and went to school on a school farm. The boys disobeyed and secretly traveled to the Governor's house. The entire town thought they drowned. They enjoyed their summer vacation and lived like royalty. The Governor intervened at the school and they were allowed back to pursue their education.

By the late fall of 1823, Photius and Anastasius were transferred to New Haven Connecticut. The boys learned English. They were attending Hopkins Academy in New Haven Connecticut. They remained at the institution for two years. They were with Rev. Dr. Herrick. They studied English, Greek Latin, arithmetic, algebra, geography, and the other required education. The boys were preparing to attend college at Amherst Massachusetts. Regrettably, the Board of Foreign Missions separated Photius and Anastasius. They no longer lived together.

They were sent to Amherst and attended an academy affiliated with Amherst College. At this institution, they were preparing to attend Amherst. It was similar to a pre-college. They learned Greek and Latin languages, algebra, geometry, astronomy, and other branches. Photius and Anastasius were not allowed to leave the school because they were from a foreign country. They needed special permission such as a leave of absence during the summer vacation. The son of a prominent pastor invited Photius to vacation in Brattleboro, Vermont. Anastasius warned and pleaded with him not to leave. Photius enjoyed an amazing summer riding on horseback in Vermont. Photius returned to Amherst in the fall and he was informed by the President of Amherst College Heman Humphrey that he was expelled. It was his second offense against the Board of Foreign Missions. They sent Photius back to his uncle in Malta. Anastasius continued his studies but decided not to become a pastor and studied law instead.

== Slavery and the Americas ==
Photius was back in Malta with his uncle Panages Maneses, who secured a position for Photius in the newly formed Greek government. Photius had a special order signed by Ioannis Kapodistrias.

The Photius took a ship called the Helene to Aegina, where he was instructed to wait for the outcome of the Battle of Navarino. Instead, Photius took the forty dollars given to him by Ioannis Kapodistrias and traveled to Smyrna. He wanted to travel back to the United States to finish his education, so he found a captain traveling to New York.

However, the ship never made it to New York City, and instead Photius was stranded on the Caribbean island of Martinique. Luckily, he was already acquainted with the American consul at New Haven; he knew him from New Haven.

Martinique was where Photius first witnessed chattel slavery. He was horrified, and formed a deep personal hatred for slavery; he already had been taught about the horrors of Ottoman slavery when he was a child, and the institution instilled fear in him, and seeing slavery firsthand reinforced the horror.

He was able to find passage to New York from the island, but first had to stop in Wilmington, North Carolina. At this location, he witnessed American Slavery, and found the institution was even more horrific than what he saw in Martinique.

In 1828, Photius found himself stranded in New York City without any money. Gerard Halleck, wealthy philanthropist and editor of the Journal of Commerce, helped Photius in the beginning. Photius worked as a pharmacist on Greenwich Street in Manhattan. He also worked at a hardware store on Broadway. He stayed in New York City for several years.

Here began his work as an abolitionist. He attended revival meetings and met Samuel Hanson Cox, an abolitionist minister who integrated his congregation, allowing African-American members. His church was called the Laight Street Church and was located at the corner of Laight and Varick streets. Arthur Tappan was a member. African American Presbyterian Reverend Samuel Cornish attended services and sat next to Arthur Tappan. Cox preached that Jesus may have had dark skin. This information traveled throughout New York City and an anti-abolitionist mob formed, eventually leading to the New York anti-abolitionist riots. The mob attacked the Laight Street Church and destroyed Cox's home. Cox ultimately fled the city with his family and Photius.

Photius was invited to become a member of the Congregationalist church. He devoted the rest of his life to the gospel ministry and the abolitionist cause. He was accepted on full scholarship by Dr. Rev Samuel Hanson Cox. From 1834 to 1837, Cox held a position at the Auburn Theological Seminary in Auburn, New York; it was a safe place for the minister and his family. Photius stayed at the institution for three years as they prepared him for the Gospel ministry.

Photius was no longer under the restriction he once experienced in New England, and freely enjoyed his summer vacations. On one occasion he traveled to Niagara Falls. A poem was written in his honor by his friend Carruth. The poem explained their entire visit to Niagara Falls. He noted that Photius was adventurous, and went under the falls to retrieve a stone.

After a rigorous examination, Photius finished his studies as a minister and was placed at a church in Halifax, Vermont. After he became a minister he started to go by the name Fisk.

== U.S. Navy Chaplain ==
He did not like Halifax, Vermont, because of the cold weather. Vermont was an abolitionist-friendly state. Philhellene and abolitionist Jonathan Peckham Miller lived in Vermont. After a while, he traveled to New York and other parts of the northeast preaching in different cities. By 1840, he was in Washington D.C. preaching.

John Quincy Adams was a member of the House of Representatives. He was acquainted with Photius. He invited Photius to become a Navy Chaplain. Samuel L. Southard, Joshua Reed Giddings and other members of the Government approved his nomination. Some members knew he was an abolitionist but the Legislative and Executive branches approved his nomination. He was stationed on the frigate Columbia.

On July 22, 1842, the ship left New York on course for Africa pursuing slave trading vessels. Regrettably, the captain and most of the officers on the vessel owned slaves. They did not actively pursue the traders. Photius was very open about his views on slavery which created animosity with some officers. By November 1842, the frigate Columbia was in Rio de Janeiro, Brazil. Photius was an educated scholar. He showed an interest in the sciences. While in Brazil, he collected mineral specimens and made scientific observations. He collected the specimens for Amherst College and other institutions in the United States.

The frigate Columbia cruised the South American waters for more than a year. The captain and crew were ordered to join the Mediterranean Squadron in February 1844, they set sail. Captain Edward Rutledge Shubrick suddenly died on March 12, 1844. He was Rear Admiral William Shubrick's brother. The crew reached the American Naval Station at Mahón. Chaplain Fisk performed the funeral rights. Commander Joseph Smith and all the officers of the Mediterranean Squadron and the entire crew of the Columbia were at the funeral.

The frigate Columbia traveled all over Europe and eventually reached Naples. Photius requested a leave of absence. The leave was granted by Commander Joseph Smith. Photius arrived in Hydra, Greece and found some of his relatives. He was looking for his mother's sister but she was dead. He found his first cousin living in poverty and gave her all his money. He traveled to Athens and met Rev. Jonas King. While he was in Athens, he attended one of the King's Balls and was introduced to the king of Greece. The U.S. Consul gave Photius money to return to the fleet because he had given everything to his cousin. After a cruise of two and a half years, the frigate Columbia arrived at Norfolk, Virginia on Dec. 30, 1844.

== Anti-flogging campaign ==
Photius was back in the United States in 1845 and he was assigned chaplain of the Washington Navy Yard. He stayed at this post for five years. He went to Washington because he wanted to lobby members of the government for abolitionist causes. Prominent Greek American Master Gunner George Marshall was also stationed at the Navy Yard. Photius stayed in the same boarding house as Congressmen Samuel L. Southard. John Quincy Adams and Joshua Reed Giddings were also close friends of Photius and abolitionists.

A large majority of chaplains in the U.S. Navy wanted to abolish the practice of flogging. Photius joined the group of chaplains and tirelessly lobbied to abolish the practice. Samuel L. Southard, Henry Clay, John Quincy Adams and Joshua Reed Giddings were all part of the movement to abolish the practice but the bill was defeated many times during his five-year service at the Washington Navy Yard. The nation was divided on the idea and the media was publishing mixed views on the subject.

Around December 21, 1847, the government introduced a bill to officially change Photius Fisk's name to Fisk from Kavasales. Regrettably, Fisk's close friend former President and abolitionist John Quincy Adams died on February 23, 1848, one day after Washington's birthday. On May 3, 1848, a bill was passed changing Photius Kavasales to Photius Fisk. The government finally abolished flogging in the U.S. Navy in 1850. Six months before the bill was passed Fisk was reassigned to the Frigate Raritan.

== Collection of rare plants ==
Photius gained a reputation in the Navy for his work on the flogging legislation. The seamen admired him and some officers disliked his views. On August 25, 1850, the frigate Raritan sailed for South America; by October they were in Brazil. Assigned to the Pacific Squadron, the ship passed Cape Horn and by January 11, 1851, they were in Valparaíso, Chile. Around the spring, the crew met with the flagship frigate Savannah in Paita, Peru. The Raritan traveled all over South America, and sometime in June 1852, the crew wanted to go to San Francisco. The Commander did not allow the crew to do so because in 1849, he had docked there and over 1000 men of the Pacific Squadron had disappeared due to the California gold rush.

Recall Photius collected minerals on his tour as chaplain on the frigate Columbia. He still conducted scientific exploration of minerals and plants. On this trip, he collected rare plants and seeds for the United States Botanic Garden in Washington. Some of the genera he collected were Stanhopea, Cattleya, Epidendrum, Dendrobium, the vanilla plant, and several other named and unnamed species. A majority of the flowers were from Brazil. He also collected the butterfly orchid Psychopsis papilio from Saint Thomas, which he carefully guarded. He kept careful notes of his observations of the plants. Ironically the Raritan stopped at the Galapagos Islands on August 6, 1852, as had Charles Darwin during the 1830s. When the ship arrived in the United States in February 1853, he immediately went to Washington and gave the plants to the superintendent and botanist of the United States Botanic Garden, W. D. Breckenridge.

== Abolitionist road to the Civil War ==
By the Summer of 1853, he was reassigned to Pensacola Navy Yard in Florida. He remained in this position for five years. He was a known abolitionist. Officers and seamen knew Photius lobbied to stop flogging in the U.S. Navy. This benefited the slaves. As late as June 1855, the navy yard payroll listed 155 slaves. One to three people showed up to church service on Sundays. When Photius visited the local town sometimes people shouted angry slurs and spit on him. He was afraid of having problems with the local slave owners and he frequently kept to himself. He stayed secluded reading and playing with his pet animals and birds. He kept constant communication with abolitionists, namely Samuel L. Southard and Joshua Reed Giddings. He paid to erect a monument for abolitionist Captain Daniel Drayton in 1857. After five years, in the fall of 1858, he was reassigned.

Photius took a leave of absence for three months. The Navy sent him orders to wait at the Charlestown Navy Yard in Boston for two years until they completed his reassignment. Around early 1859, in Boston, he was active within the abolitionist community. He was very close to William Lloyd Garrison, Wendell Phillips, Theodore Weld, Parker Pillsbury, and other anti-slavery agitators. He donated large sums of money to the abolitionist cause. In May 1859, Photius was with John Brown in Boston. Brown was preparing for his raid on Harpers Ferry. Photius donated one hundred dollars to Brown and his cause. Roughly 3000 dollars adjusted for 2020 inflation. He also obtained his autograph which was presented to the Kansas Historical Society.

During the outbreak of the American Civil War, he was in Boston aiding the abolitionist cause. Mainly funding different endeavors. Around 1861, Photius donated a substantial amount of money to abolitionist William Shreve Bailey. Photius was instrumental in funding abolitionist causes during the American Civil War. Another Greek American abolitionist John Celivergos Zachos was in Boston around this period assembling his book for the free people of the South. Photius's leave continued until 1864. He was retired by order of Abraham Lincoln on July 18, 1864. After the war, Photius continued his philanthropic effort. He amassed close to forty thousand dollars. Adjusted for 2020 inflation, the amount was close to one million dollars. He contributed large sums of money to Berea College and the Holley School at Lottsburgh, Virginia. He also sent them crackers.

== Philanthropy and abolitionist monuments ==
After his retirement, he purchased a thirty-six-acre farm in Franklin, Massachusetts. His interest in botany continued. He entertained many abolitionist friends, such as William Lloyd Garrison, Wendell Phillips, Theodore Weld, James Redpath, and Parker Pillsbury. Many more important figures frequently visited his rural retreat. He provided for the local poor and gave anything that he grew to the destitute. His farm was open to people of every color, race, and condition. Apples, pears, peaches, and berries were carefully picked. They were sent as free gifts to charitable organizations and anti-slavery friends. After two years he sold the farm and moved back to Boston.

Photius continued his charitable work. He rented rooms for poor people. He divided his time between helping the needy and local newspapers. He also spent time with Wendell Phillips and other friends. In the fall of 1870, he paid to erect a monument for Henry Clarke Wright at Swan Point Cemetery, Providence, Rhode Island. In one instance he donated one hundred dollars to the captain and crew of the White Rover for saving two people's lives.

He withdrew six thousand dollars to travel all over the world namely Greece. The amount was close to one hundred thirty thousand dollars according to 2020 inflation. He originally intended to travel all the way to China but his trip was cut short. He traveled to Greece for two years. He visited his relatives and again gave them money. He saw his childhood friend Anastasius Karavelles. The trip ended early in May 1873. Photius was afraid the markets would collapse, and he traveled back to the United States. He brought back artwork, pictures, relics of antiquity, marine shells, and mineral specimens.

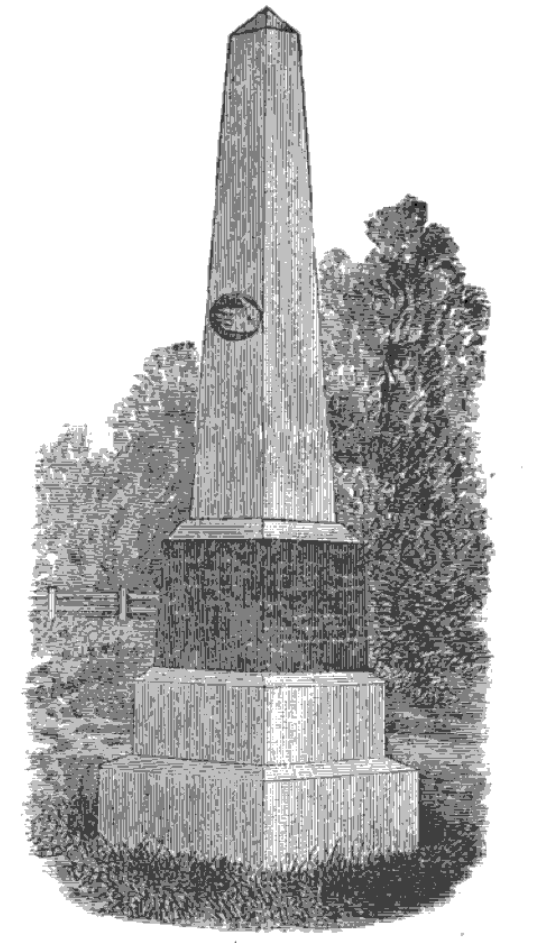
Jonathan Walker Monument

When Photius returned to the United States, he made large financial donations towards anti-slavery monuments, such the monument erected by the anti-slavery society for Charles Turner Torrey.

In the spring of 1868, William Shreve Bailey was printing two weekly papers in Nashville, Tennessee in support of General Grant. He continued issuing Republican circulars, but on November 30, 1875, his printing press was burned, so Photius contributed a sizeable amount of money for Bailey to continue his printing business.

In 1878, Photius erected a monument for Jonathan Walker. Six thousand people were at the funeral. The monument became a national shrine for those working towards racial justice.

A fellow Greek American named Michael Anagnos lived in Boston and was the head of the Perkins School for the Blind; Photius gave the institute a large donation. In 1881, he donated 129 volumes of Ancient Greek books to the University of Iowa.

In 1884, Chaplain Fisk donated one thousand dollars to the Paine Memorial Company which owned the Paine Memorial building, the home of the Boston Investigator. The condition of the donation was that the money would support lectures in Paine Hall. He also donated his valuable collection of pictures and artifacts which he collected in Europe and the United States. The collection at the time was worth thousands of dollars, and was sent to the Paine Memorial Building in Boston. The building was located at 11 Appleton Street and burned down in 1940.

In the fall of 1886, Chaplain Fisk erected another monument for his abolitionist friend William Shreve Bailey.

Fisk continued his philanthropy until his death. In the span of twenty-five years from the close of the American Civil War until his death, Photius contributed to dozens of philanthropic organizations and countless individuals. He contributed to the tuitions of poor students attending Harvard, Yale, Amherst, and Dartmouth Colleges. After his death, his massive fortune was donated to the poor and destitute. The trustees of his will were instructed to disburse the money to the impoverished as they deemed fit. The Colored Woman's Home was listed by name. Lyman F. Hodge published his autobiography in 1891. He detailed some of the philanthropic contributions of Photius and outlined his life story.

== Monuments erected ==
- Captain Daniel Drayton Monument,1857
- Henry Clarke Wright at Swan Point Cemetery, Providence, Rhode Island, 1870
- Charles Turner Torrey Monument, 1873
- Jonathan Walker Monument Muskegon, Michigan, 1878
- William Shreve Bailey Monument, 1886

== Philanthropic contributions ==
- Berea College
- Holley School
- Office of American Secular Union
- The Massachusetts Society for the Prevention of Cruelty to Children
- Colored Home
- Male Orphan Asylum, Athens, Greece
- Iowa College
- Perkins School for the Blind
- Thomas Paine Memorial Corp., Boston
- Office of Free Thought, San Francisco
- Free Religious Index
- Salem Orphans and Children's Friend Society
- Boston Investigator

== Monument Gallery ==
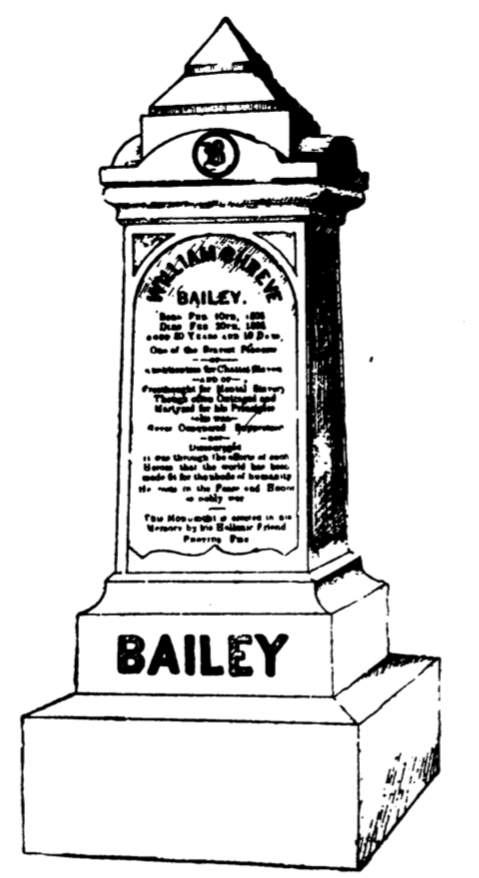
William Shreve Bailey Monument

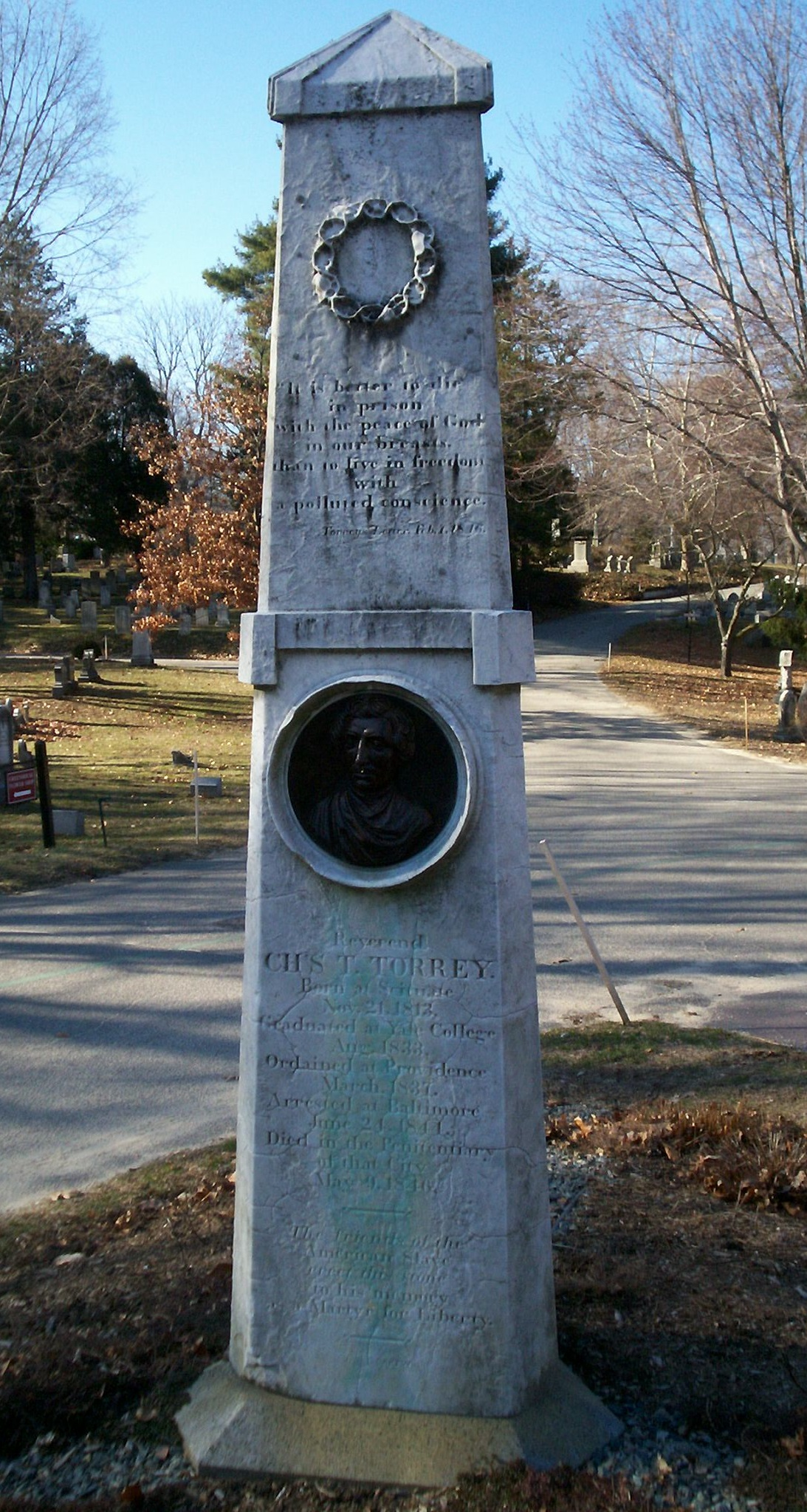
Charles Turner Torrey Monument

== See also ==
- George Colvocoresses
- Garafilia Mohalbi
- Joseph Stephanini
- Greek Slave Movement

== Bibliography ==
- Hodge, Lyman F. (1891). Photius Fisk A Biography. Boston, Mass: Lyman F. Hodge.
