= Samuel Hanson Cox =

American minister and abolitionist (1793–1880)

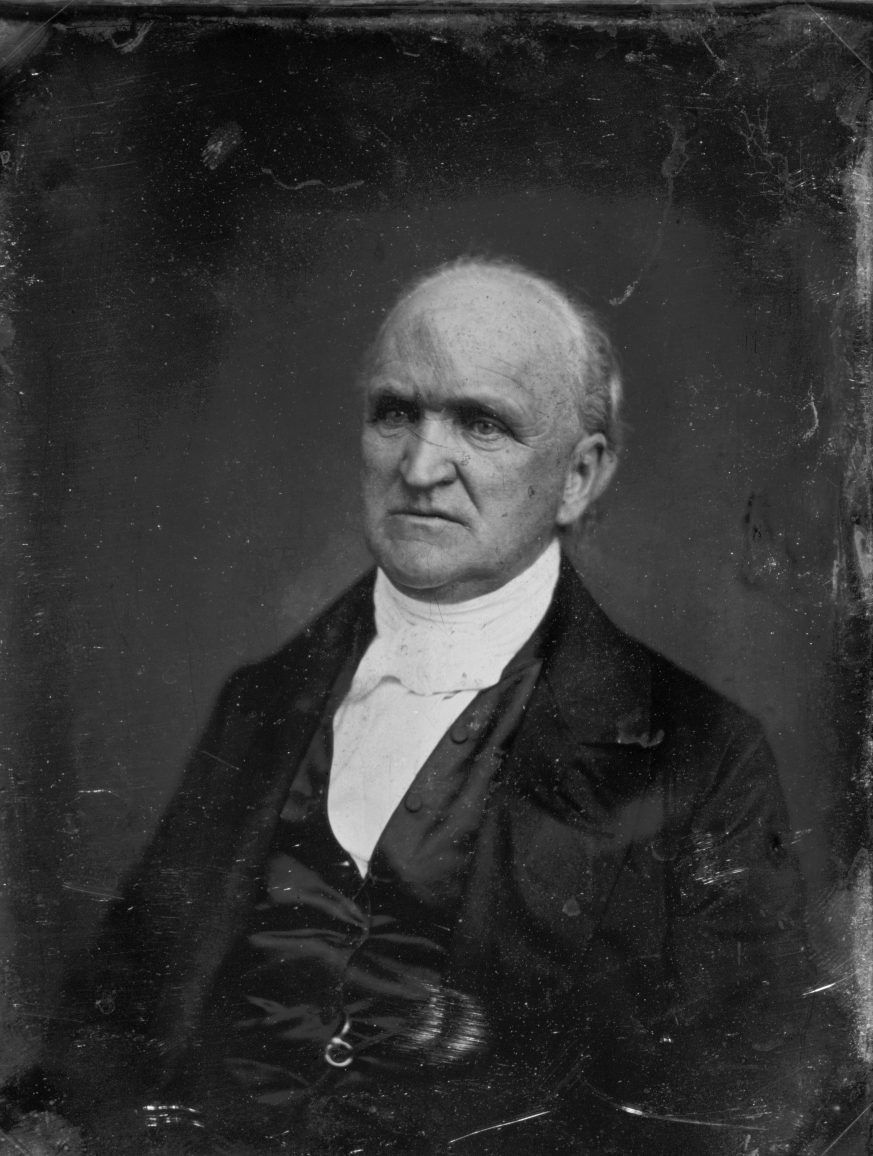
Cox, between 1844 and 1860

Samuel Hanson Cox (August 25, 1793 – October 2, 1880) was an American Presbyterian minister and a leading abolitionist. He led the Laight Street Presbyterian Church, known for its abolitionist beliefs.

== Biography ==
Cox was born on August 25, 1793, in Rahway, New Jersey, to a Quaker family. After renouncing his religion and serving in the War of 1812, he studied law before entering the ministry. He was pastor of the Presbyterian church in Mendham, New Jersey, from 1817 to 1821. He then moved to New York City, where he was pastor of two churches from 1821 to 1834. In the early 1830s, Cox helped African American John Sykes Fayette get to Ohio with fellow abolitionists, where he would become the first African American to attend (1832) and graduate (1836) college west of the Appalachian Mountains at what is now Case Western Reserve University. Cox helped found the University of the City of New York, now New York University, in 1832, teaching classes in theology and contributing the college's motto, Perstare et praestare ("To persevere and to excel").

Due to his anti-slavery stance, Cox was mobbed, and his house and Laight Street church were sacked in the Anti-abolitionist riots of 1834, and he was burned in effigy by another mob in Charleston, South Carolina, in 1835. After the riots, he moved out of the city. In 1834, Cox invited abolitionist Photius Fisk to Auburn on a free scholarship. Photius traveled with Cox and his family. Cox was professor of pastoral theology in Auburn, New York, and he stayed in this position from 1834 to 1837.

Cox was known beyond the church for his skills as an orator, despite or perhaps because he was described as "eccentric" and would sometimes lapse from English into Latin. One speech he made in Exeter Hall in 1833, in which he put the responsibility for slavery in America on the British government, made such a great impression that it was widely republished. Theodore Ledyard Cuyler described Cox as "one of the most famous celebrities in the Presbyterian Church... famous for his linguistic attainments, for his wit and occasional eccentricities, and very famous for his bursts of eloquence on great occasions." When awarded the appellation of Doctor of Divinity by Williams College, he famously derided it as a couple of "semi-lunar fardels".

Cox's next seventeen years were passed as pastor of the First Presbyterian Church in Brooklyn Heights, while also serving as Professor of Ecclesiastical History at the Union Theological Seminary, and as a leader of the "New School" Presbyterians. In 1854, owing to a throat infection and loss of his voice, he removed to Owego, New York. He died at Bronxville, New York, on October 2, 1880.

Cox's son, Arthur Cleveland Coxe, became bishop of the Episcopal Diocese of Western New York, and another son, Samuel Hanson Coxe, was an Episcopal minister in Utica, New York, who married Eliza Conkling, sister of Republican political boss and presidential candidate Senator Roscoe Conkling; both of them, along with some other of his 15 children, reverted to an earlier spelling of the family name. His descendants Alfred Conkling Coxe Sr. and Alfred Conkling Coxe Jr. became judges.

== Works ==
- Quakerism not Christianity (1833)
- Interviews, Memorable and Useful (1853)

Religious titles
| Preceded by The Rev. Ansel Doan Eddy | Moderator of the 54th General Assembly of the Presbyterian Church in the United States of America (New School); 1849–1850 | Succeeded by The Rev. Philip Courtlandt Hay |
