= Henry Clarke Wright =

American abolitionist, pacifist, anarchist and feminist (1797–1870)

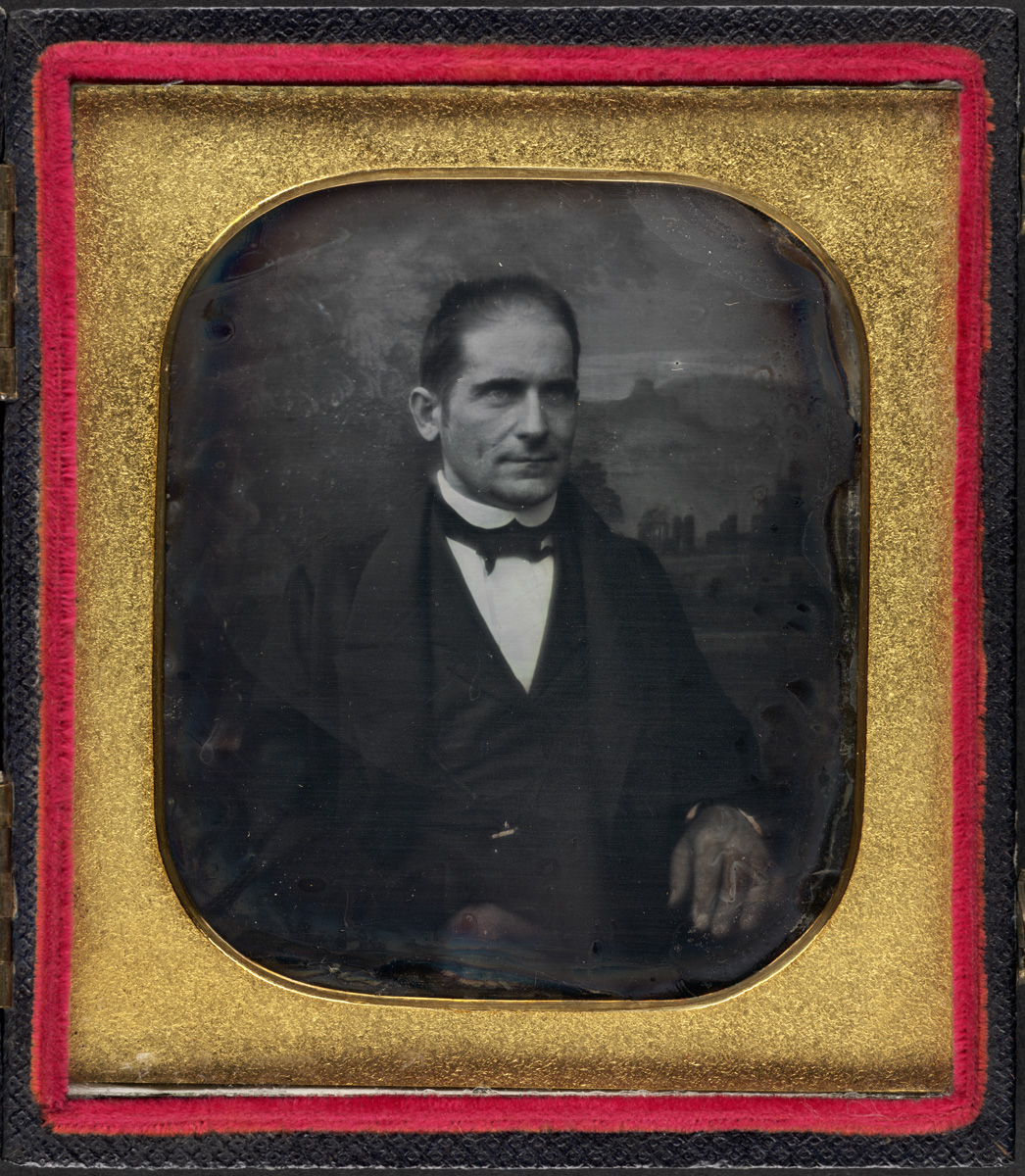
- Daguerreotype of Wright circa 1847
- Born: August 29, 1797; Sharon, Connecticut, US
- Died: August 16, 1870 (aged 72); Pawtucket, Rhode Island, US
- Education: Andover Theological Seminary
- Movement: Abolitionist; Pacifist; Anarchist; Feminist

Henry Clarke Wright (August 29, 1797 – August 16, 1870) was an American abolitionist, pacifist, anarchist and feminist. He was fervent in his beliefs and often was more extreme in his rhetoric than other peace activists or abolitionists. Wright was a close friend of William Lloyd Garrison and the two men collaborated on many issues. Wright was also a supporter of universal suffrage and women's rights.

== Early life ==
Wright was born in Sharon, Connecticut, on August 29, 1797. His father was Seth Wright, a farmer and house-joiner who was also veteran of the American Revolutionary War. Wright's father was an authoritarian and controlling parent. The religion that Wright was raised with was in the Westminster Catechism tradition. In 1801, when he was four, the family moved to the "western country" of Hartwick in upstate New York. During his childhood, he lost both his mother and his stepmother. After the family moved to Hartwick, Wright lost his mother at age six. As a child, Wright helped raise some of his siblings and step-siblings and helped with household chores.

As a young man, Wright worked as an apprentice to a hat-maker in Norwich, New York from 1814 to 1817. He didn't complete the apprenticeship and left through a "mutual agreement" with his employer, David Bright. Wright experienced an emotional religious conversion in 1817 and he went on to join the Presbyterian Church. He went on to study first under the local minister. In 1819, he attended the Andover Theological Seminary. He started out by studying around 16 hours every day while eating a diet of "crackers, milk and water." During his studies, he became less orthodox in his beliefs, feeling that the violence in the Bible was disgusting. Wright was absolutely certain in his views and did not compromise on issues he cared about.

Wright met Elizabeth LeBreton Stickney, a widow, while he was attending the theology school in Andover. They were married on June 26, 1823.

== Missionary work ==
During 1824, Wright preached in New Hampshire. He was eventually ordained as a Presbyterian Minister in West Newbury, Massachusetts on June 21, 1826. While he worked as a minister, he found that his beliefs did not align with his church, even though he brought in more than 70 new parishioners. Eventually, he was dismissed from this ministry on July 5, 1833.

Wright adopted the role of "Christian reformer" and social reformer by the 1830s. In the peace movement, he sided with radical pacifists who promoted an ethic of non-violence in all forms of conflict. Wright condemned any type of slavery and took arguments brought to him to their logical conclusion. He believed that slavery was a form of violence that should be resisted as strongly as war. He also believed that human governments should be abolished so that all humans could become closer to God. Wright believed that it was less important to associate God with religion or "popular notions" than it was to associate God with humanity, and in this respect, he sometimes called himself an "atheist." By 1845, Wright published his belief that the New Testament should supersede the authority of the Old Testament when there were differences between guidance on a topic.

Wright met William Lloyd Garrison in 1835 and they began to talk seriously about peace, nonviolence and religion. On anti-slavery, he sided with Garrison, promoting immediate abolition. Wright also saw abolition as a civil rights and human rights issue.

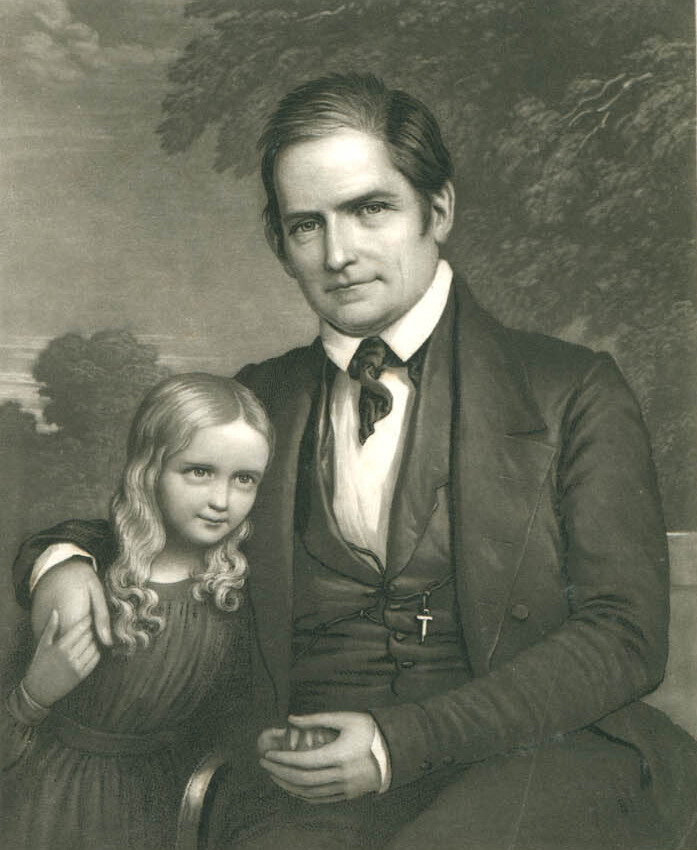
Engraving of Henry C. Wright and unknown child.

Wright became involved in the American Peace Society (APS) along with Garrison and others in 1835. During that year, Wright worked as "traveling agent" for the APS. He traveled almost 2,000 miles throughout the Northeast during this summer when he worked as an agent. He resigned from the APS after working this job for three months because his anti-violence stance was too radical for the groups "comparatively conservative executive committee."

Later, his Newburyport home served as headquarters in summer 1837 for Angelina Grimké and Sarah Grimké. Wright was in charge of the sisters' speaking tour in 1837 and treated them as intellectual equals. Wright felt that the sisters should pursue and discuss whatever topics they wished on the lecture circuit, including discussing "women's issues." In September 1837 he was fired from the American Anti-Slavery Society for his radical views.

Wright was a founding member of the New England Non-Resistance Society along with Garrison and others in 1838. Wright wrote columns for Garrison's newspaper, The Liberator, and gained respect among Northerners for moral beliefs contained within his call for non-violent immediate abolition. During the mid-1840s, Wright sent The Liberator information about his travels throughout Europe.

Wright traveled through England, Scotland and Ireland between 1842 and 1847 in order to raise money and awareness for the abolition movement in the US. During this time he lectured with Frederick Douglass and stayed at the home of Richard D. Webb. He traveled so extensively and without much rest that his health was often at risk.

While he was touring Europe, he also proposed a human rights conference, first mentioning the idea for a "World's Human Rights Convention" in 1841 in an article for The Liberator. Many abolitionists were also interested in this idea, which was never fully realized. Wright's vision for the conference was based on his belief that human rights should not be restricted by nationalism.

He also had special responsibility for organizing children's anti-slavery movements in towns across the Northeast, especially early in his ministry. During his work, he found that many children he worked with were bullied for their involvement in the abolition movement. Later, he became known as "the Children's Preacher" because of his work with young people. His book, A Kiss for a Blow, was written for children and emphasized using kindness as a strategy against all kinds of violence, "playful" or otherwise. Wright also contributed work to the children's magazine, The Slave's Friend.

Wright successfully urged the Massachusetts Anti-Slavery Society to adopt resolutions in 1857 that supported "every effort of the slave to obtain his freedom, whether by flight or insurrection." He believed that slaves had the right to use violence in order to gain their freedom and supported slave rebellions. While there were some in the abolition movement that found it strange that Wright would advocate for slave violence, it was consistent with Wright's thinking. Wright believed that slave owners were no better than kidnappers who had already inflicted violence by owning people. Wright believed in arming slave rebellions.

== Support for women's rights ==
While Wright was sympathetic to women carrying unwanted pregnancies, he believed that abortion was a form of murder. He had harsh words for husbands who abused their position of authority at home and in sexual relations with their wives. Wright believed that sex shouldn't be forced onto women.

In speeches during the summer of 1865, Wright was also an advocate of woman's suffrage, and immediately after the Civil War was one of the early advocates of "universal suffrage," – extending the vote "without regard to color or to sex." Wright spoke out against state laws intended to disenfranchise Black voters passed during Reconstruction.

Wright's nonresistant views influenced many women in the abolition movement in the late 1830s.

== Writing and speeches ==
Wright was a lifelong diarist and journal-keeper. Wright published his autobiography, Human Life, in 1849.

Wright was one of a few men who published books in the mid-nineteenth century advocating the wife's control of marital relations, his first being Marriage and Parentage; Or, The Reproductive Element in Man, as a Means to His Elevation and Happiness, published in 1854, and his second, The Unwelcome Child; Or, The Crime of an Undesigned and Undesired Child, published in 1858. Both books promoted sexual responsibility within marriage and argued that because women bore the consequences of the sexual act, wives should have the right to decline sexual relations.

Wright's speech, "The Natick Resolution," was given to around 800 listeners on November 20, 1859. In his speech, he called for immediate slave resistance and aid to all who are rebelling against their owners.

== Death and legacy ==
Wright died on August 16, 1870 in Pawtucket. The cause of death was determined to be apoplexy. Garrison gave the sermon at Wright's funeral. Wright was buried in Swan Point Cemetery and an inscribed obelisk, created by Photius Fisk was erected as a monument.
