= United States Botanic Garden =

Garden on the grounds of the US Capitol

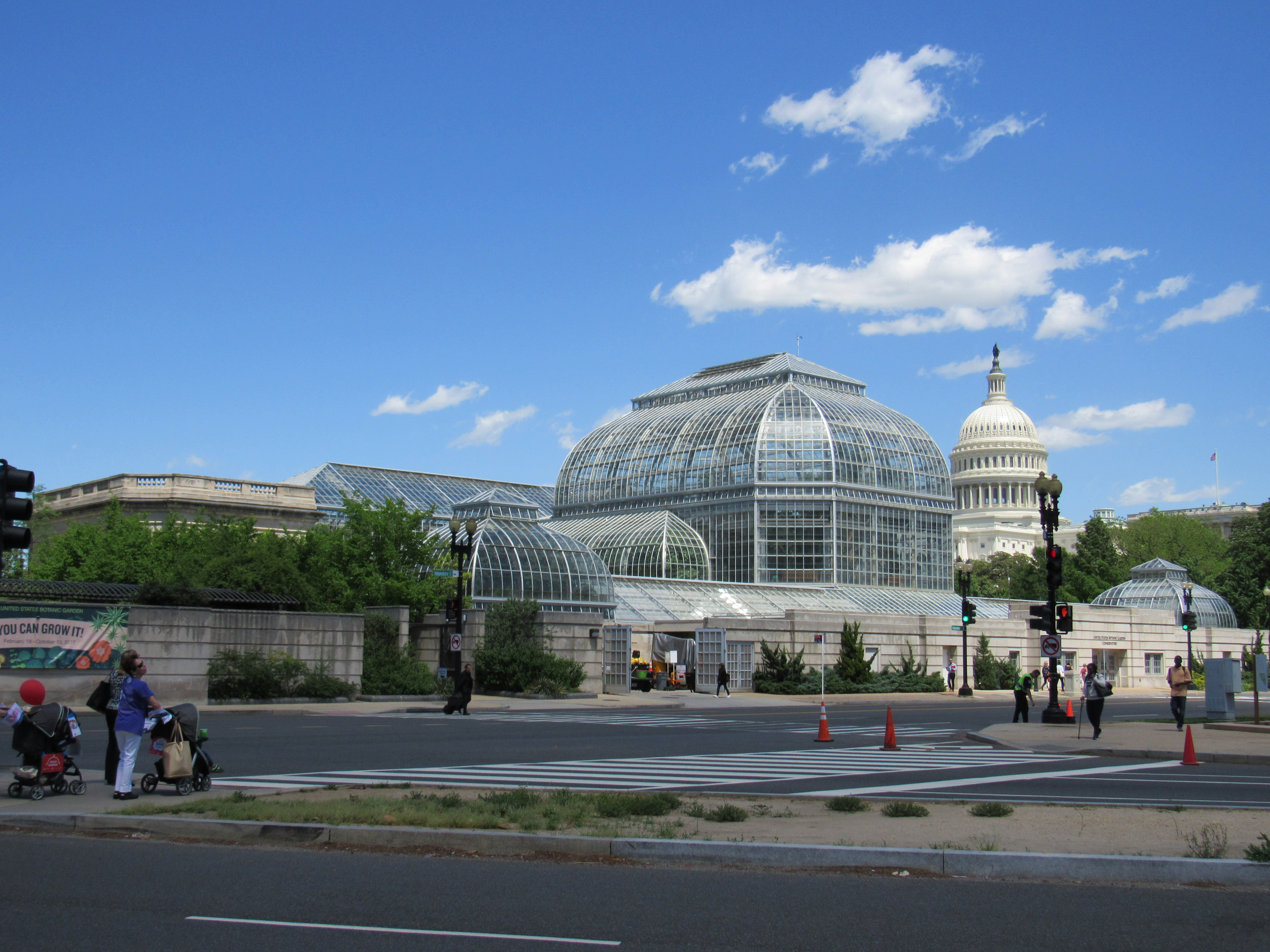
- Interactive map of United States Botanic Garden
- Type: Botanical garden
- Location: Washington DC
- Coordinates: 38.888°N 77.013°W
- Created: 1820; 206 years ago
- Operator: United States Congress
- Public transit: Federal Center SW station
- Website: www.usbg.gov

The United States Botanic Garden (USBG) is a botanical garden on the grounds of the United States Capitol in Washington, D.C., near the James A. Garfield Monument.

The Botanic Garden is supervised by the Congress through the Architect of the Capitol, who is responsible for maintaining the grounds of the United States Capitol. The USBG is open every day of the year, including federal holidays. The garden is the oldest continually-operating botanic garden in the United States.

== History ==
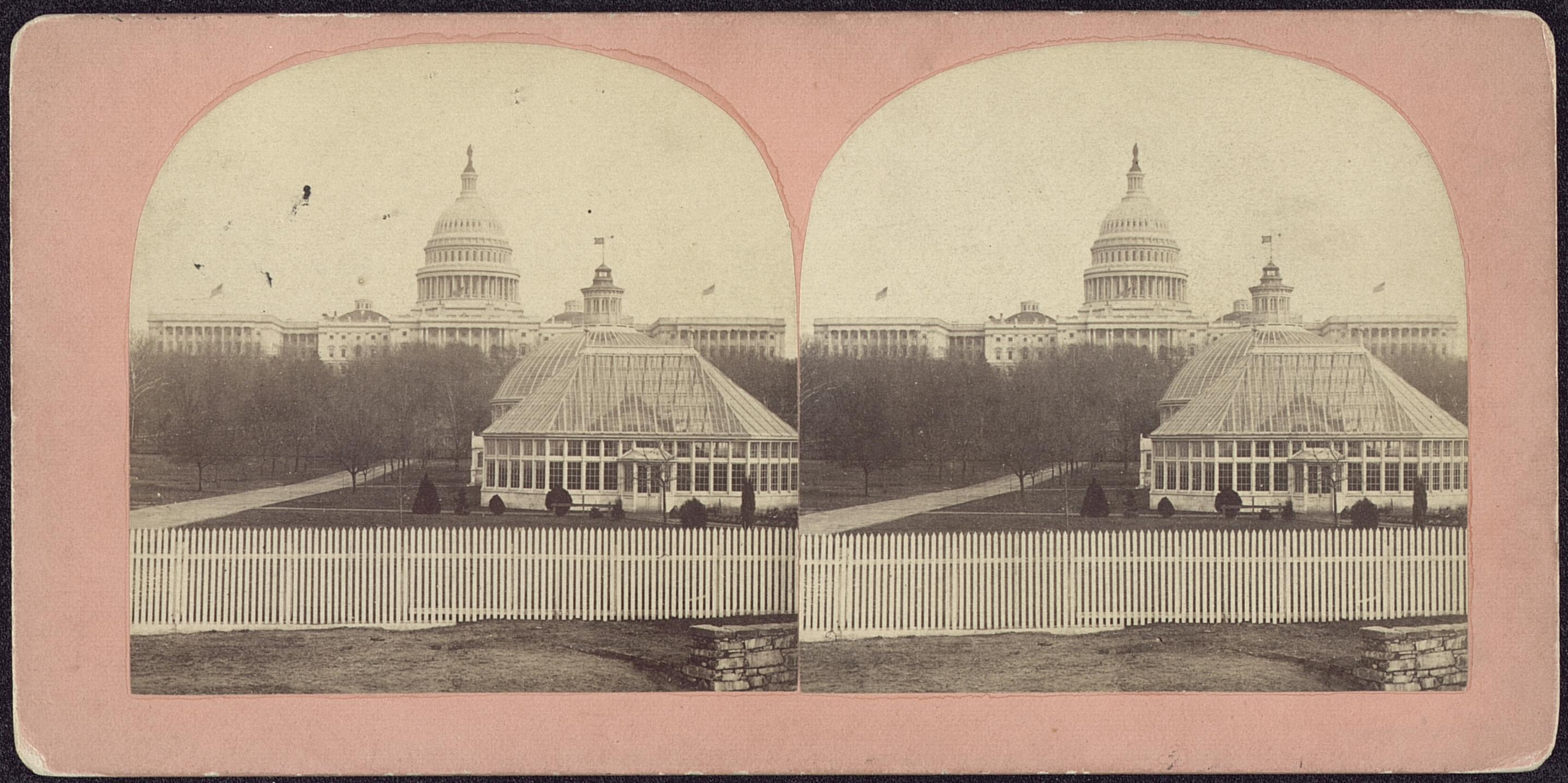
A stereogram of the United States Botanic Garden, 1867

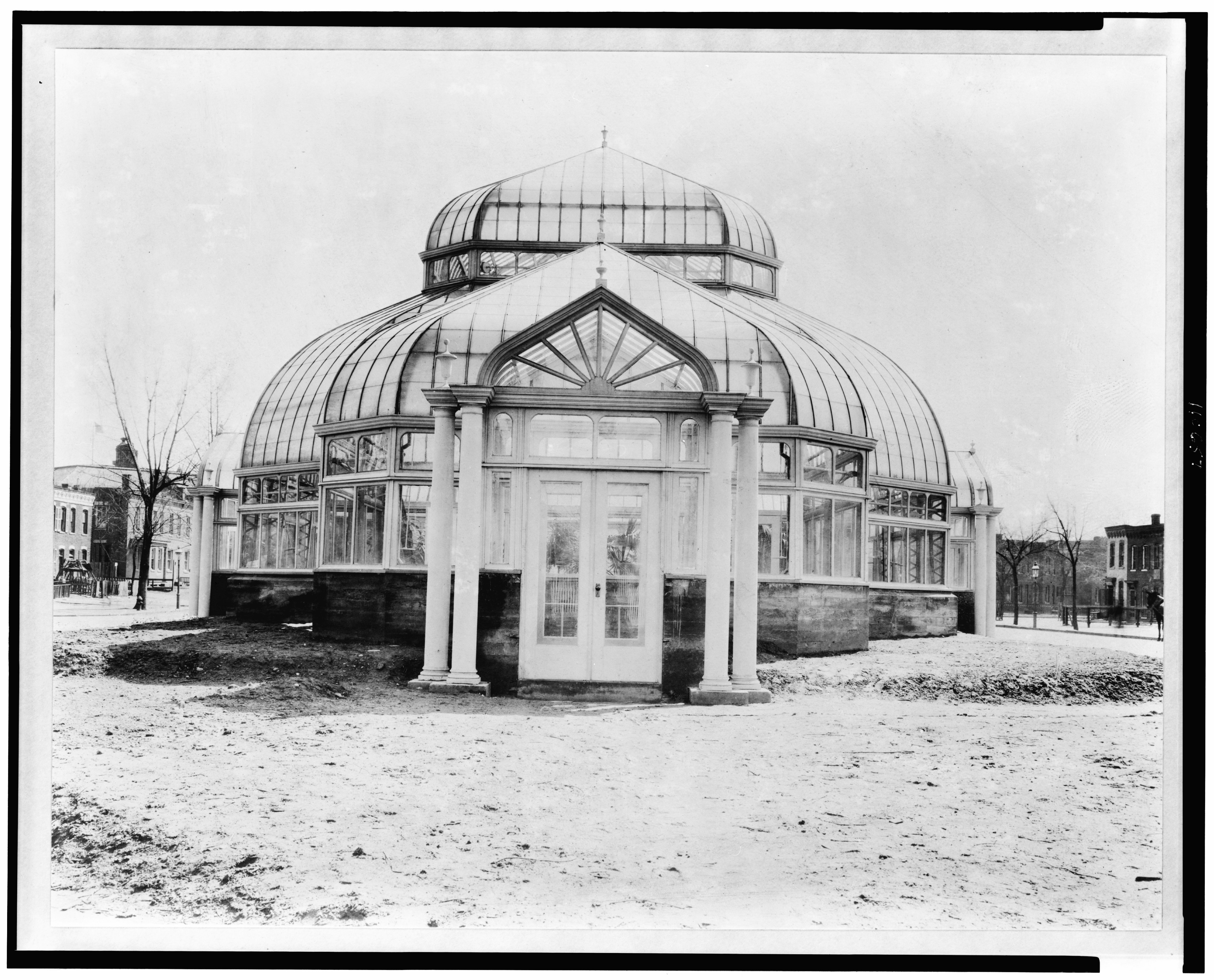
Botanic Garden exterior in the 1880s

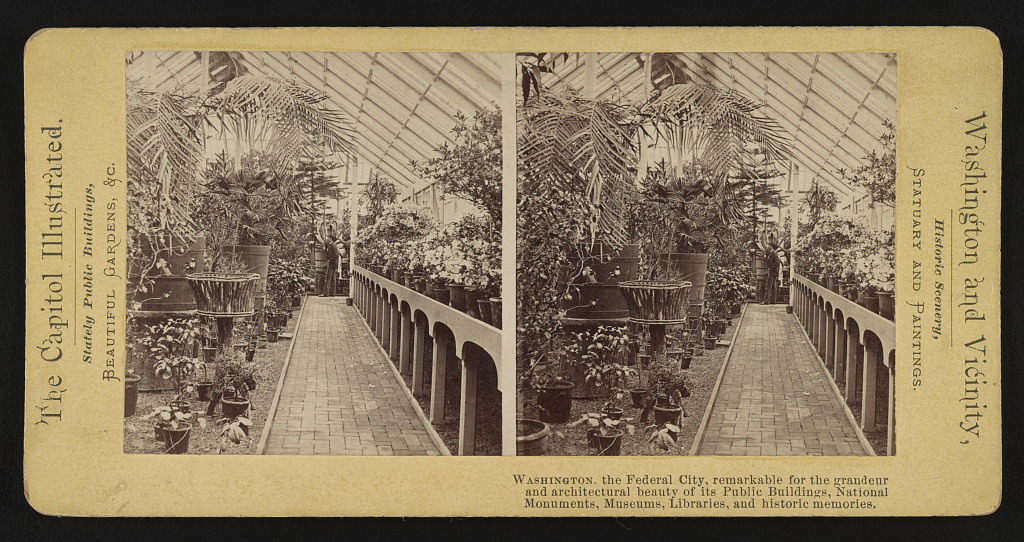
Stereograph card of Botanic Garden in 1880 (approximately)

The Columbian Institute for the Promotion of Arts and Sciences in Washington, D.C. first suggested the creation of the Botanic Garden in 1816. In 1820 it was given land by an act of Congress. The land was located west of the Capitol extending from First Street to Third Street between Pennsylvania and Maryland Avenues. The facility ceased to operate in 1837 when the society stopped holding meetings. However it was re-instituted in 1842 when the Wilkes expedition of the South Seas brought back a collection of plants.

In 1838, Charles Wilkes set out on the United States Exploring Expedition commissioned by Congress to circumnavigate the globe and explore the Pacific Ocean. During this trip (the "Wilkes Expedition"), Wilkes collected live and dried specimens of plants and was one of the first to use wardian cases to maintain live plants on long voyages. Wilkes returned in 1842 with a massive collection of plants previously unknown in the United States.

The dried specimens comprised the core of what is now the National Herbarium, an herbarium curated by the Smithsonian Institution's National Museum of Natural History. The live specimens and seeds came to be housed in the Old Patent Office greenhouse, and were cared for there until 1850. At that time, a botanic garden was built to house the collection in front of the Capitol, where the Capitol reflecting pool is now located.

Abolitionist Photius Fisk conducted scientific exploration of minerals and plants. While he was U.S. Navy chaplain on the Frigate Raritan in South America and the Pacific he collected seeds and rare plants for the United States Botanic Garden. Some of the species he gathered were the vanilla plant, dendrobium, cattleya, epidendrum, stanhopea, and several other named and unnamed species. Most of the flowers were from Brazil. He also obtained the rare butterfly flower Oncidium Papilio from Saint Thomas which he carefully guarded. Photius Fisk kept careful notes of his observations of the plants. In February 1853, he immediately traveled to Washington and gave the plants to the superintendent and botanist of the United States Botanic Garden W. D. Breckenridge.

In 1933, the building was moved to its present location, just to the southwest of the Capitol, bordered by Maryland Avenue on the north, First Street on the east, Independence Avenue on the south, and Third Street on the west.

The building was closed for renovations on September 1, 1997, and reopened to the public on December 11, 2001. At the time of closure for renovation, plants in the collection were either placed in storage at the USBG Production Facility, retired to greenhouses in Florida, or composted.

== Facilities ==
The USBG proper consists of three locations: the Conservatory, Bartholdi Park, and the Production Facility.

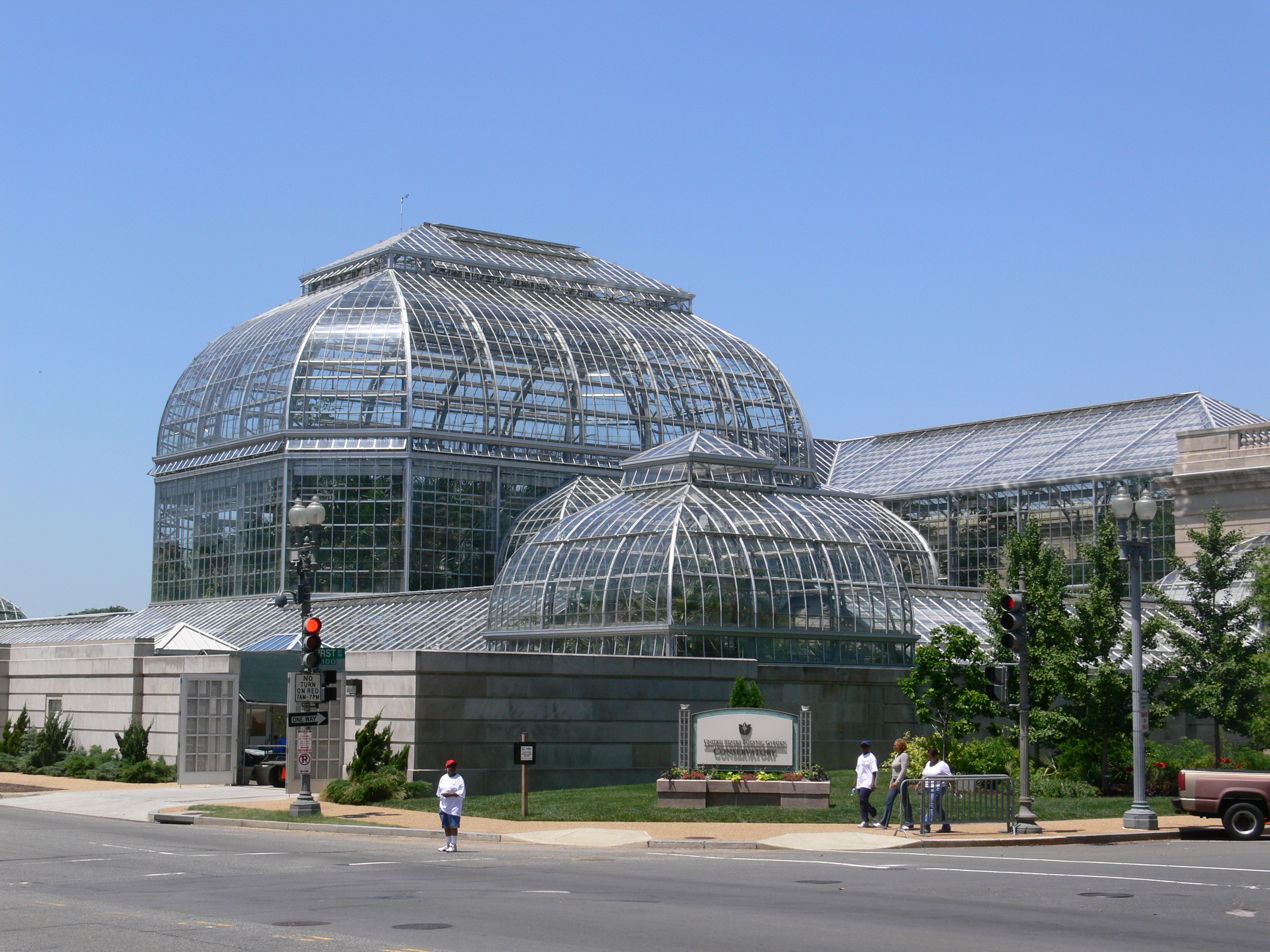
Conservatory

The Conservatory is a conservatory housed in a Lord & Burnham greenhouse. It is divided into separate rooms, each simulating a different habitat:

- The Garden Court
- Rare and Endangered Plants (rare species, endangered species)
- Plant Exploration
- Orchid House (orchids)
- Medicinal Plants (medicinal plants)
- Desert (desert species)
- Hawaii
- Garden Primeval (primeval)
- Plant Adaptation
- Jungle (jungle species; this is the largest of the rooms, and includes a second-story catwalk so that the jungle canopy may be observed from both below and above)
- Children's Garden (courtyard; features many thriving temperate annuals used to encourage interest in plants)
- Southern Exposure (courtyard), on the south side of the building, is surrounded by glass walls, receiving more warmth. It features many plants from the Southeast and Southwest, which would not be able to live in the colder District of Columbia climate if not for the microclimate)

Except for the Hawaiian house, the galleries, and the south lobby, none of the conservatory has air conditioning. Each room is closely monitored by computer-operated sensors to maintain the environment best suited to the plants in that room. Humidity, sunlight and temperature are regulated by means of a misting system, retractable shades and levered windows. All plants are watered daily by hand. Construction was completed on the 3-acre (12,000 m^{2}) National Garden on the Botanic Garden's west border, in October 2006 and the garden includes a regional garden of plants native to the Atlantic Coastal Plain and Piedmont, a rose garden, a butterfly garden, and the First Ladies Water Garden, a water garden in memory of the First Ladies of the United States.The National Garden construction was funded by the National Fund for the U.S. Botanic Garden which now exists as a 'friends group'.

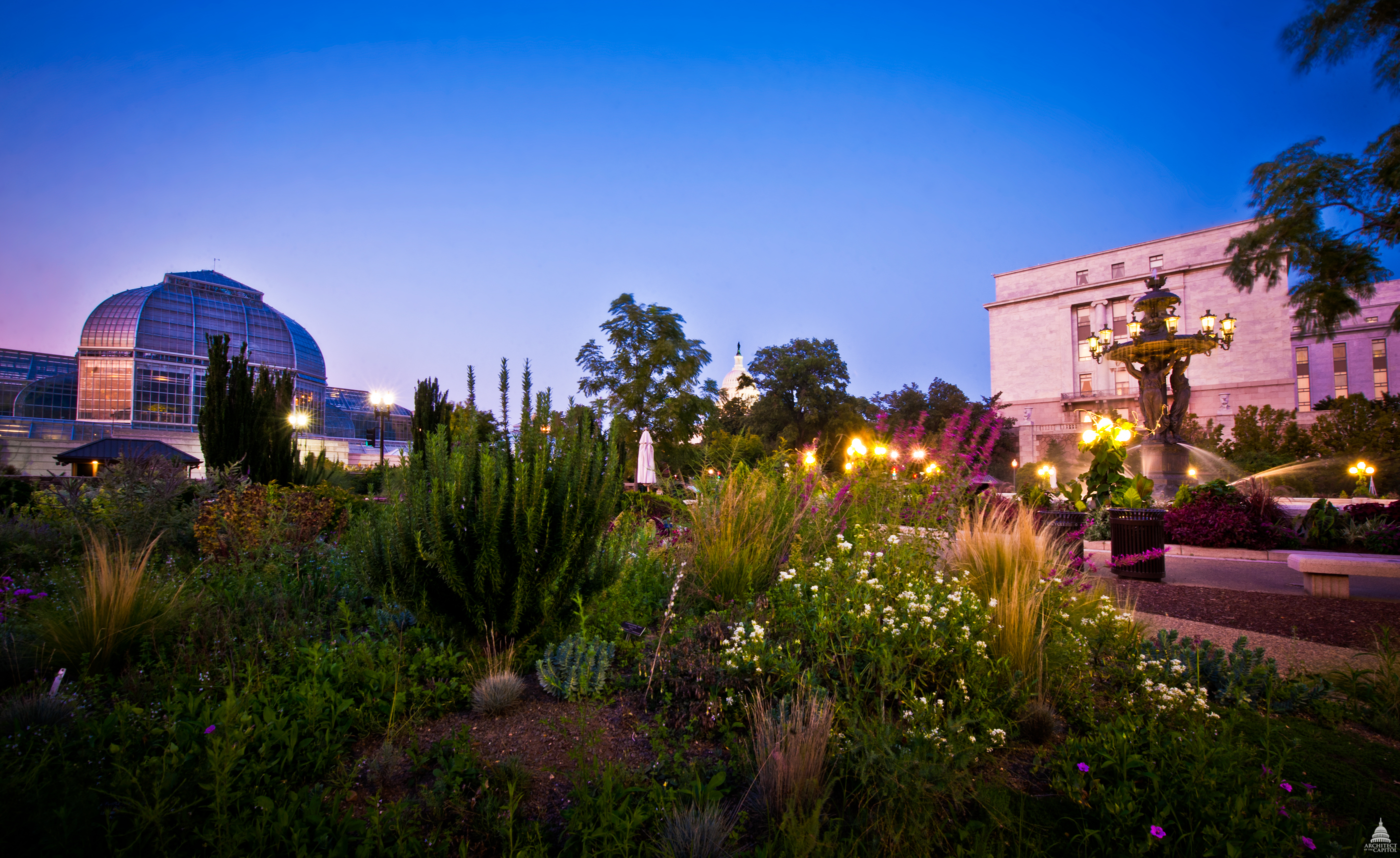
Bartholdi Park with the Conservatory in the background (far left).

Bartholdi Park lies just south of the Conservatory, across Independence Avenue. It is named for the Bartholdi Fountain in the garden's center designed by Frédéric Auguste Bartholdi. One of the goals of this garden is to provide inspiration and ideas for home gardeners who visit it. It displays a variety of small structured and non-structured gardens, and infuses color, shape, and planting themes. One section of the garden is certified as a National Wildlife Federation Backyard Wildlife Habitat. The Park also houses the administrative building for the United States Botanic Garden.

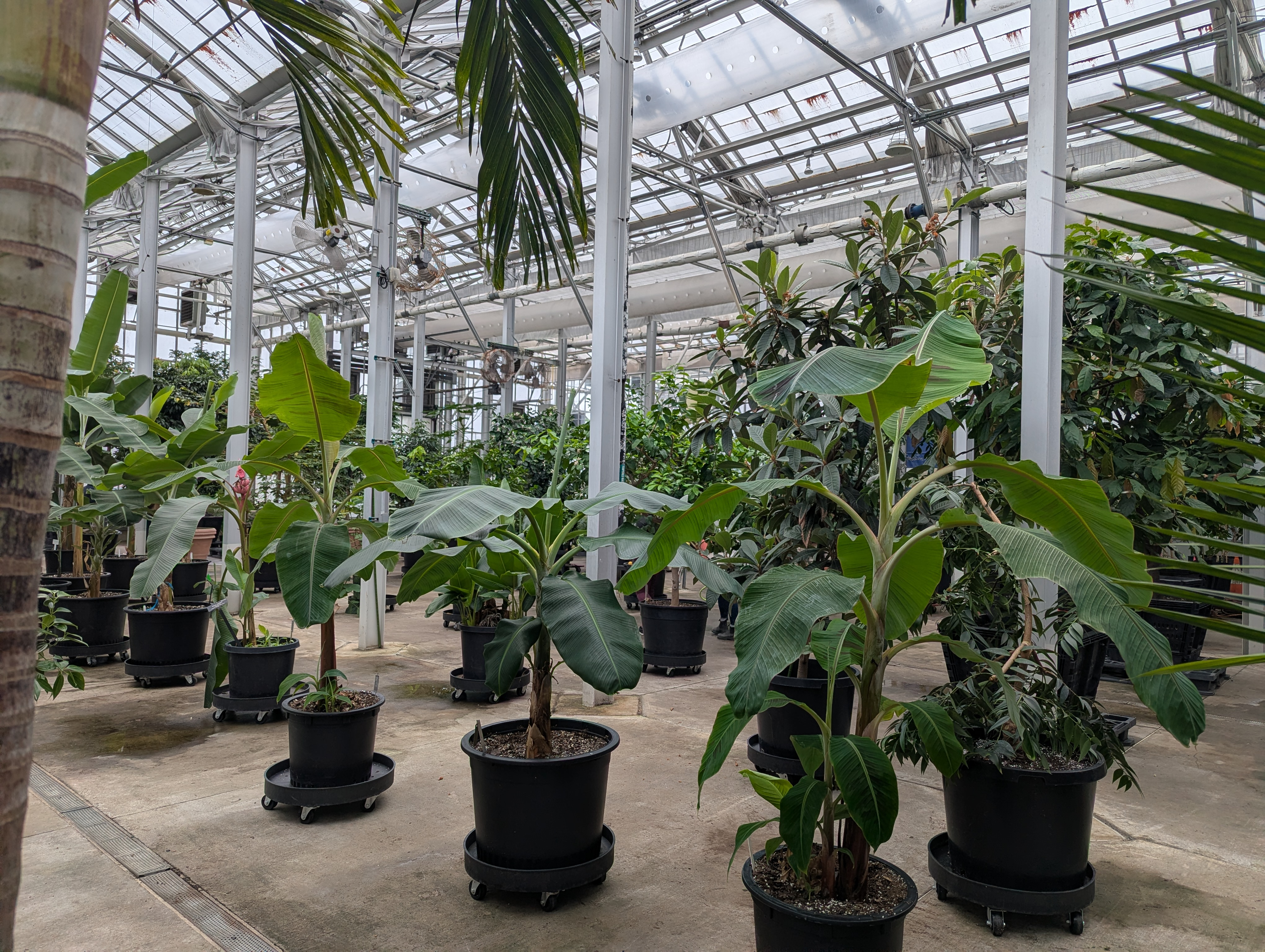
Many plants for exhibits and events are grown at the offsite Production Facility before being added to the garden.

The Production Facility in southwest D.C. is used for growing and storing plants for propagation, for collection maintenance, or for display in upcoming annual shows.

The USBG participates in CITES (the Convention on International Trade in Endangered Species), which means that it cares for plants seized by Customs. It specializes in orchids and succulents.

== Wilkes Plants ==
There are four plants in the garden that are believed to be directly related to the original Wilkes Expedition.

- The Vessel Fern (Angiopteris evecta) situated in the Jungle, is a fern believed to be the direct progeny of the Vessel Fern brought back on Wilkes' ship. Because of the lifespan of Vessel Ferns, it is highly unlikely that the present fern is the original; however it is believed that the present fern is a direct descendant and genetically identical to the original.
- The Ferocious Blue Cycad (Encephalartos horridus) is a cycad questionably one of the original Wilkes plants. Due to its size and possible age, some believe this plant to have come back with the expedition in 1842; unfortunately, early records are incomplete and inaccurate, so this is left to speculation.
- The Queen Sagos Cycas circinalis, which are cycads, live in the Garden Court. The Botanic Garden cares for both a male and a female of the species, and both were brought back with the Wilkes Expedition.

== Gallery ==
Aerial view of the area, with the gardens located in the bottom right.

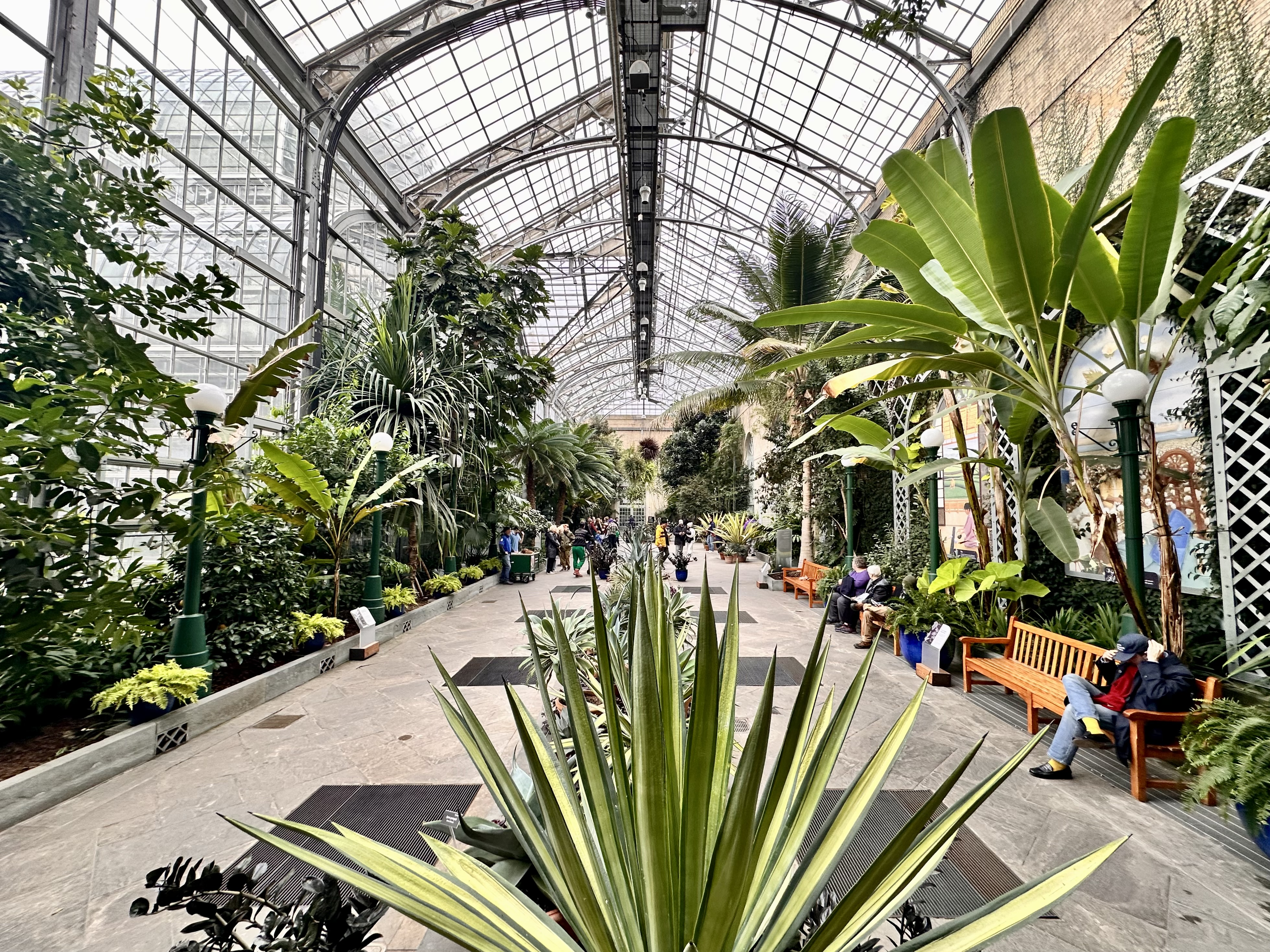
Inside the greenhouse lobby.

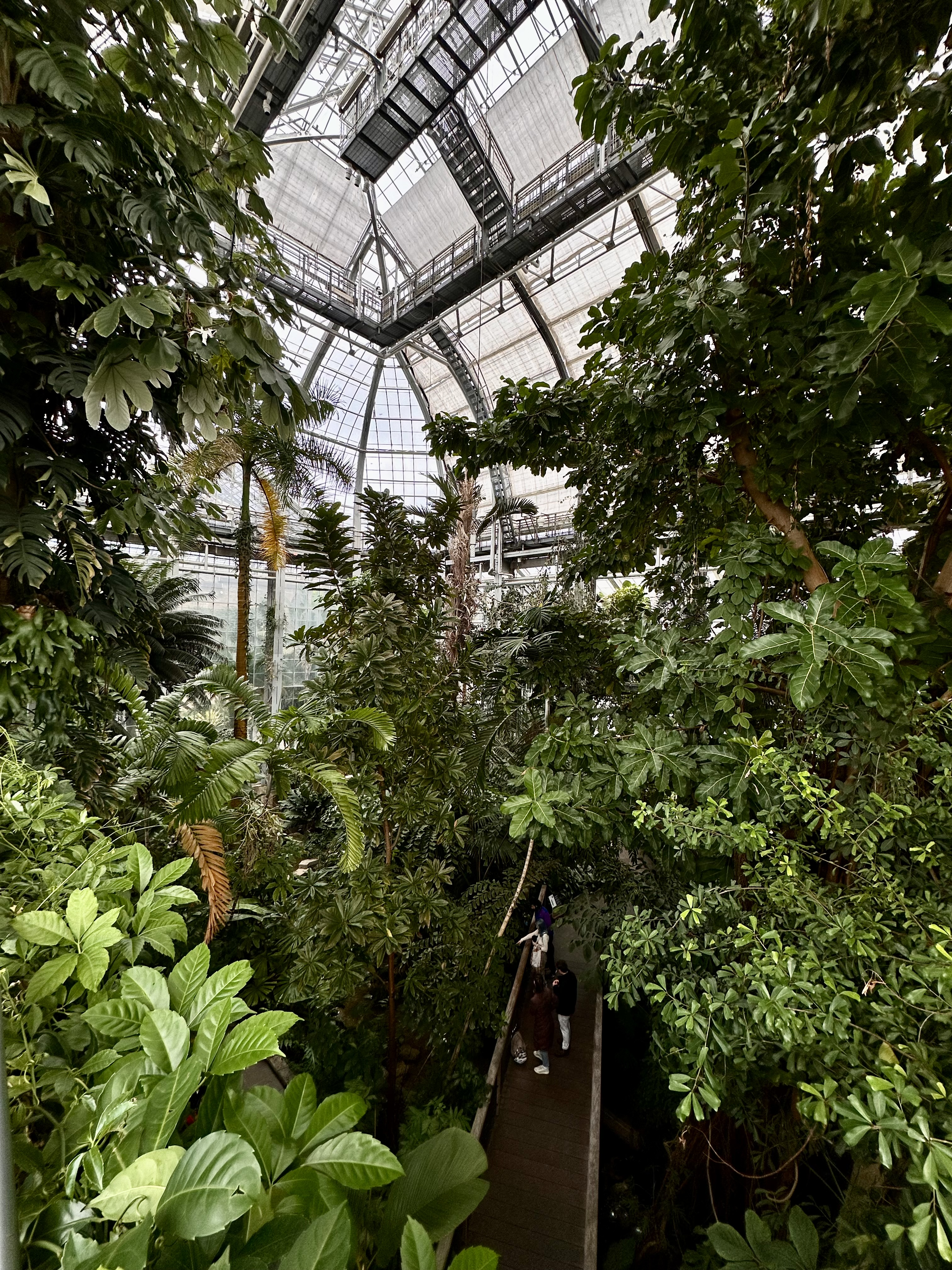
Inside primary greenhouse, showing tropical walkway.

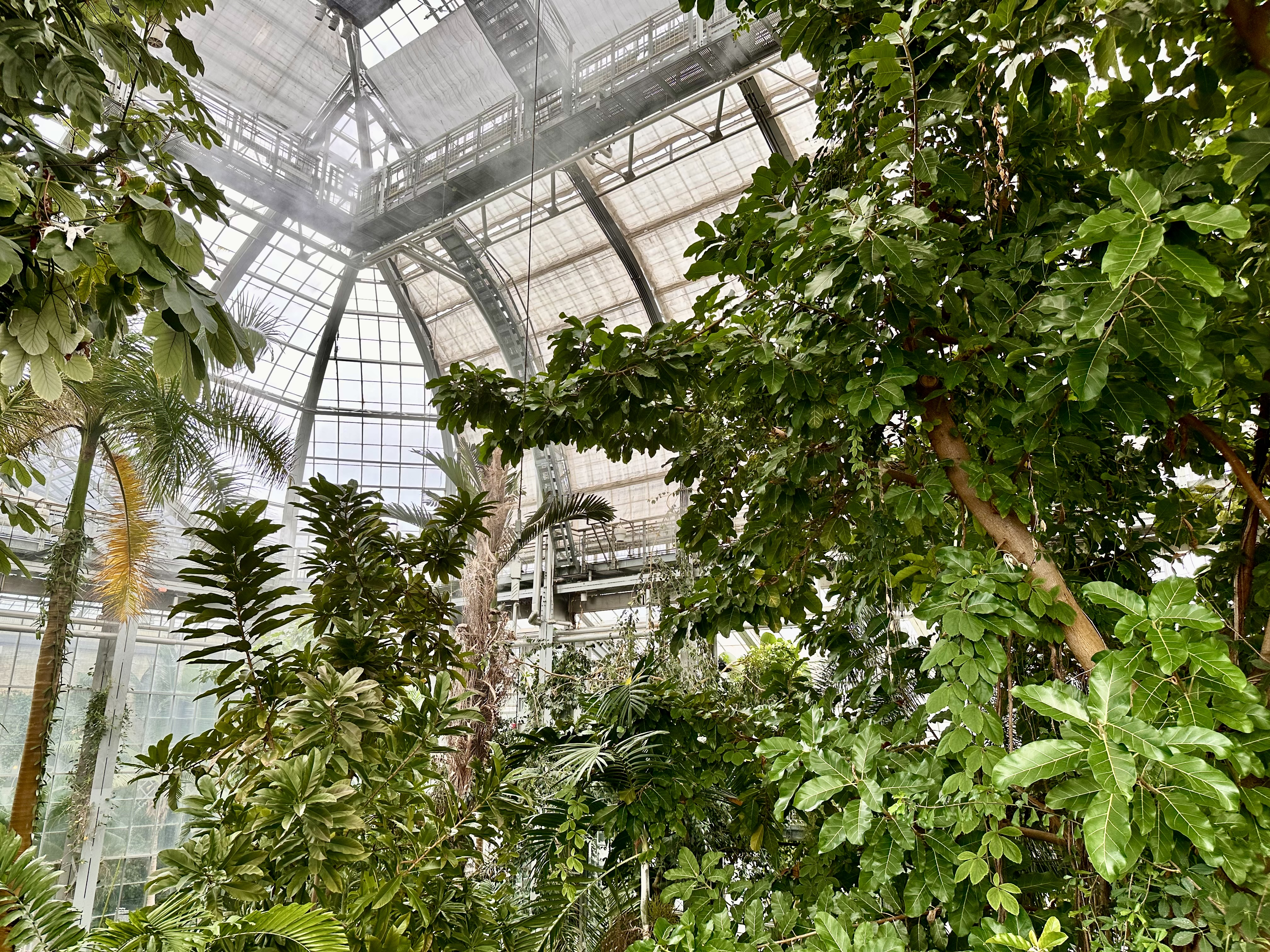
Primary greenhouse roof.

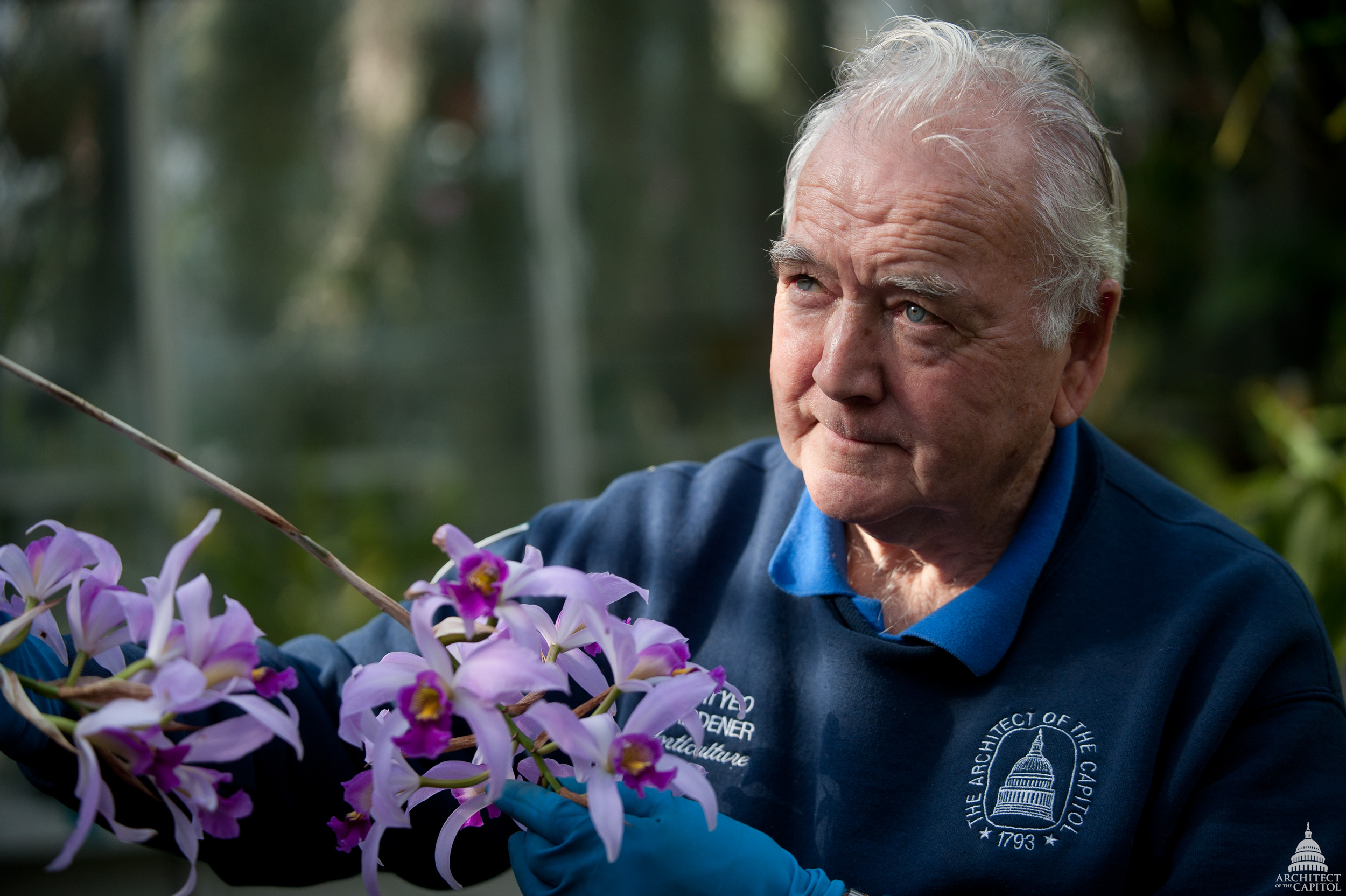
One of the gardeners that maintain the plants.

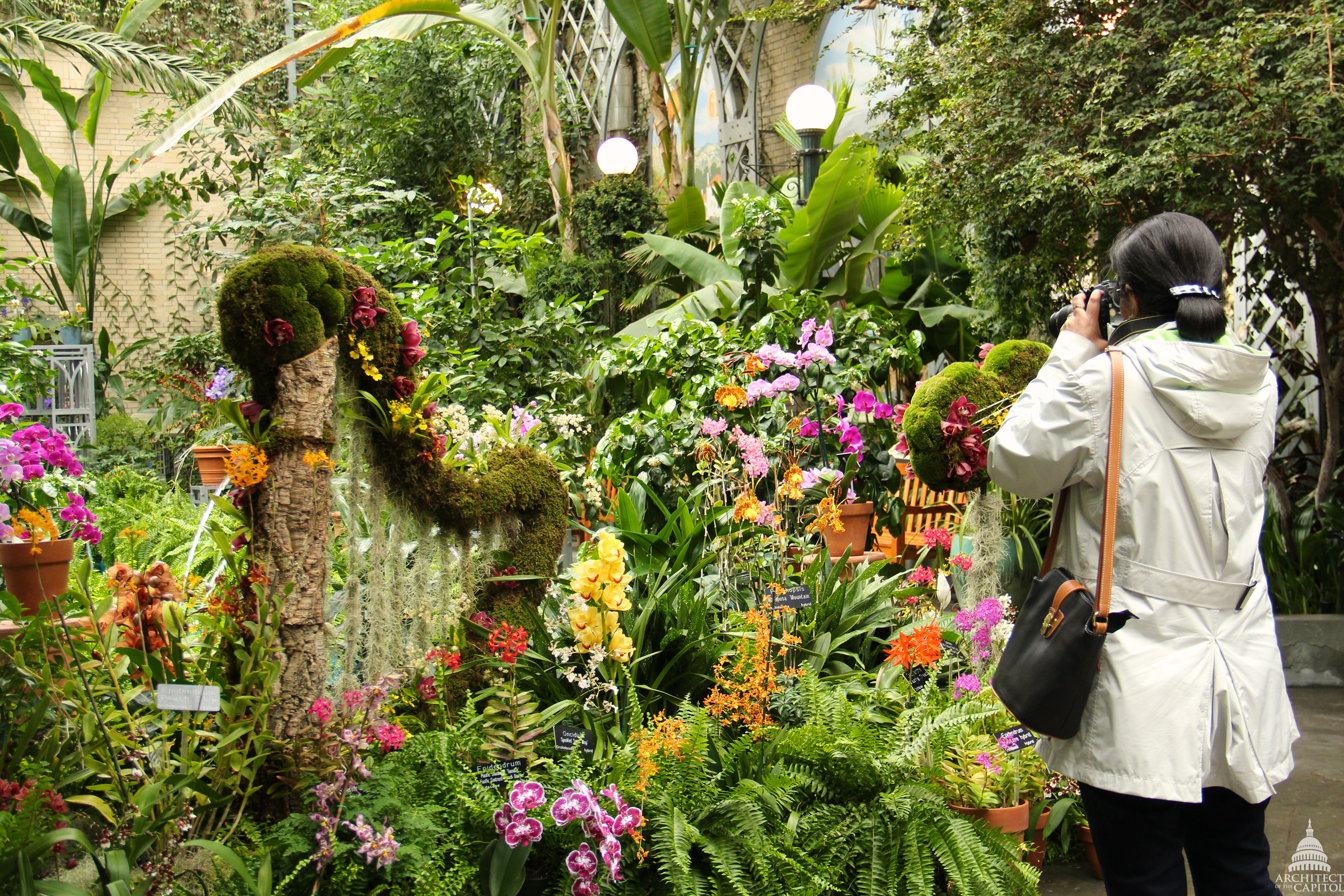
Orchid Symphony exhibit.

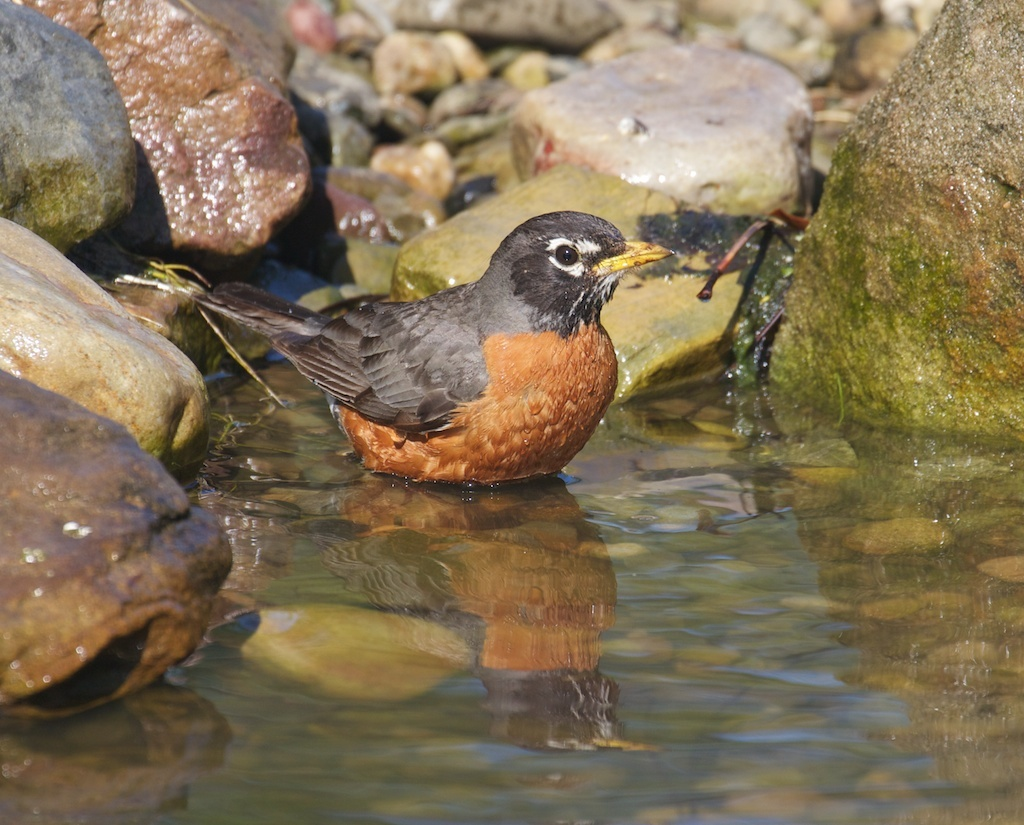
American robin (Turdus migratorius) at one of the gardens.

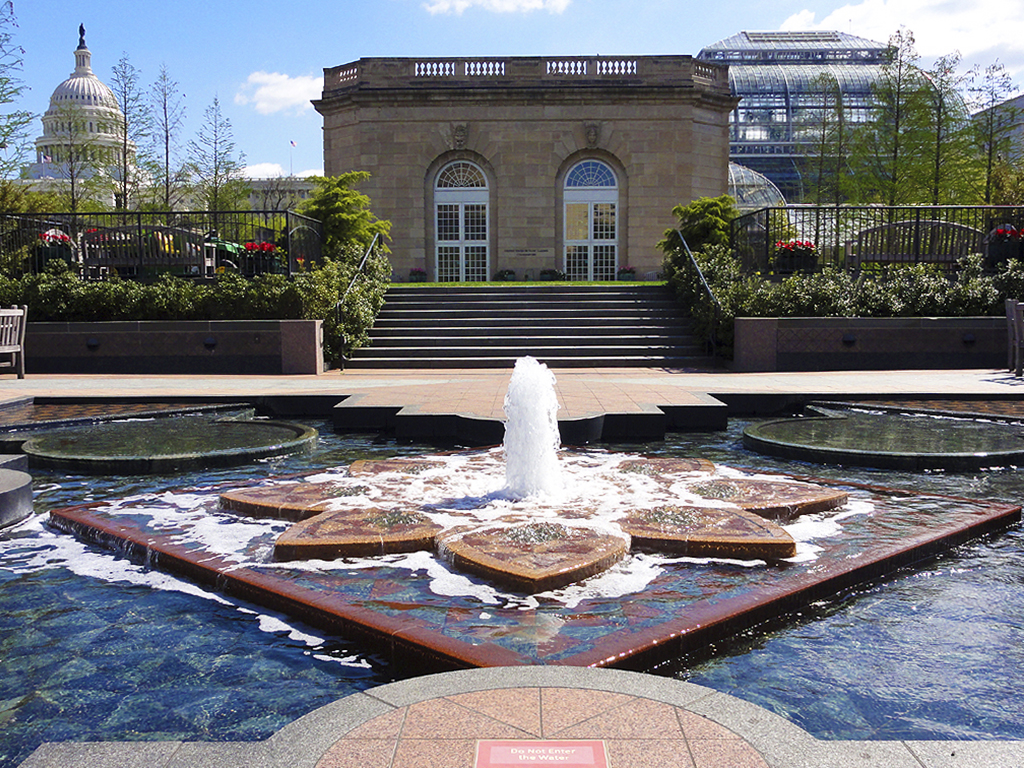
First Ladies Water Garden.

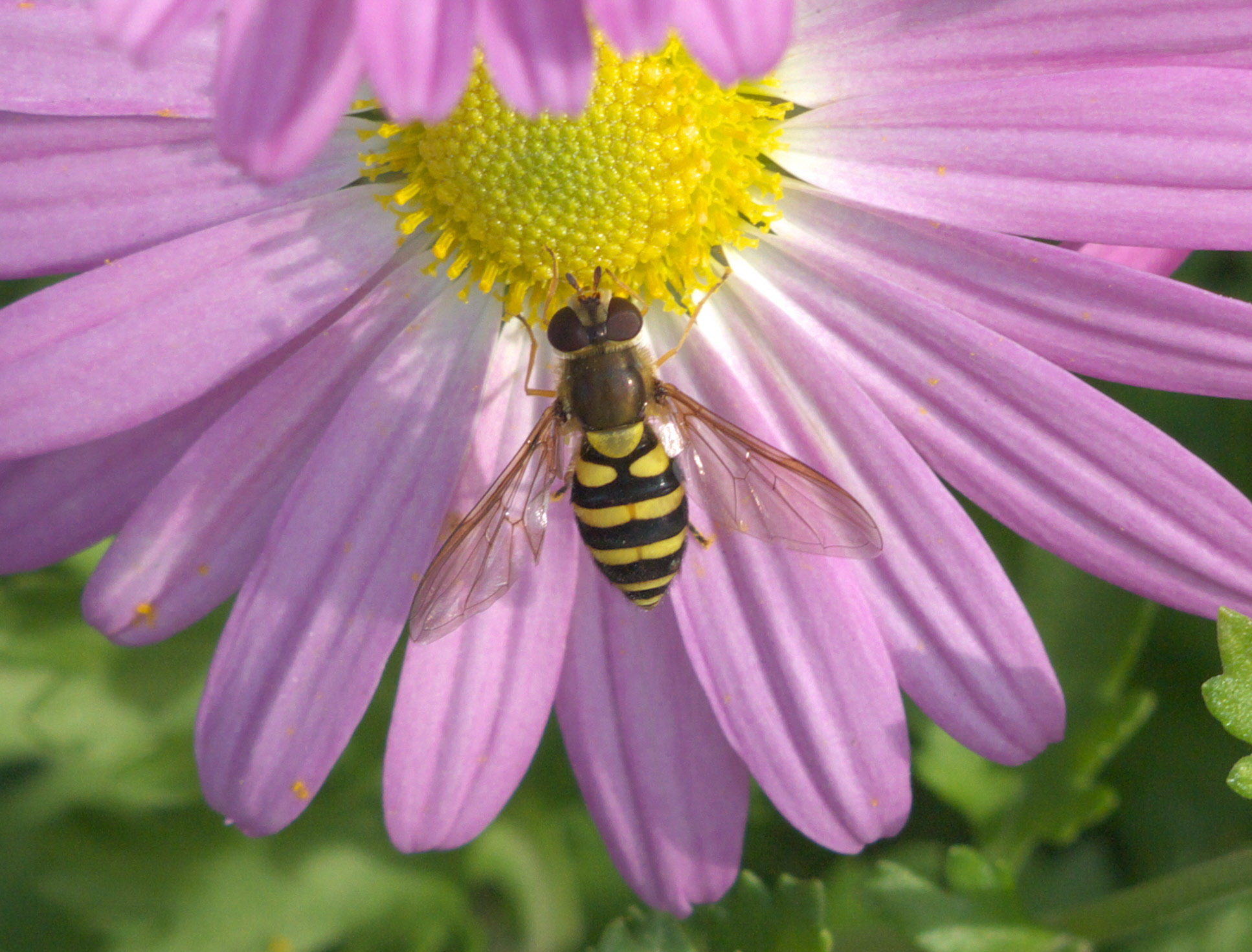
Syrphus on a asteraceae flower.

View inside the conservatory highlighting orchids on display. (Video).
