= List of Underground Railroad sites =

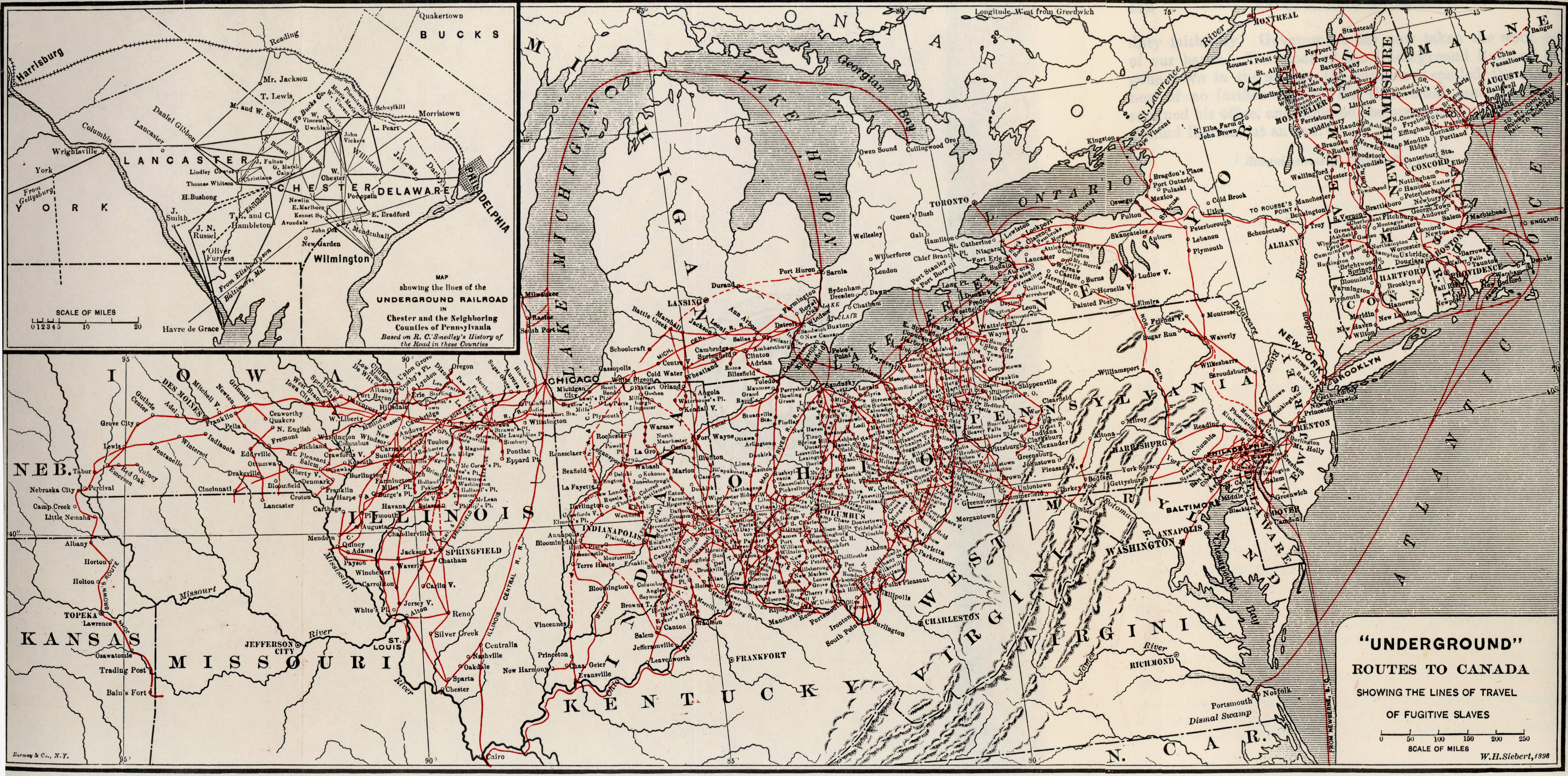
Underground Railroad routes

The list of Underground Railroad sites includes abolitionist locations of sanctuary, support, and transport for former slaves in 19th century North America before and during the American Civil War. It also includes sites closely associated with people who worked to achieve personal freedom for all Americans in the movement to end slavery in the United States.

The list of validated or authenticated Underground Railroad and Network to Freedom sites is sorted within state or province, by location.

== Canada ==
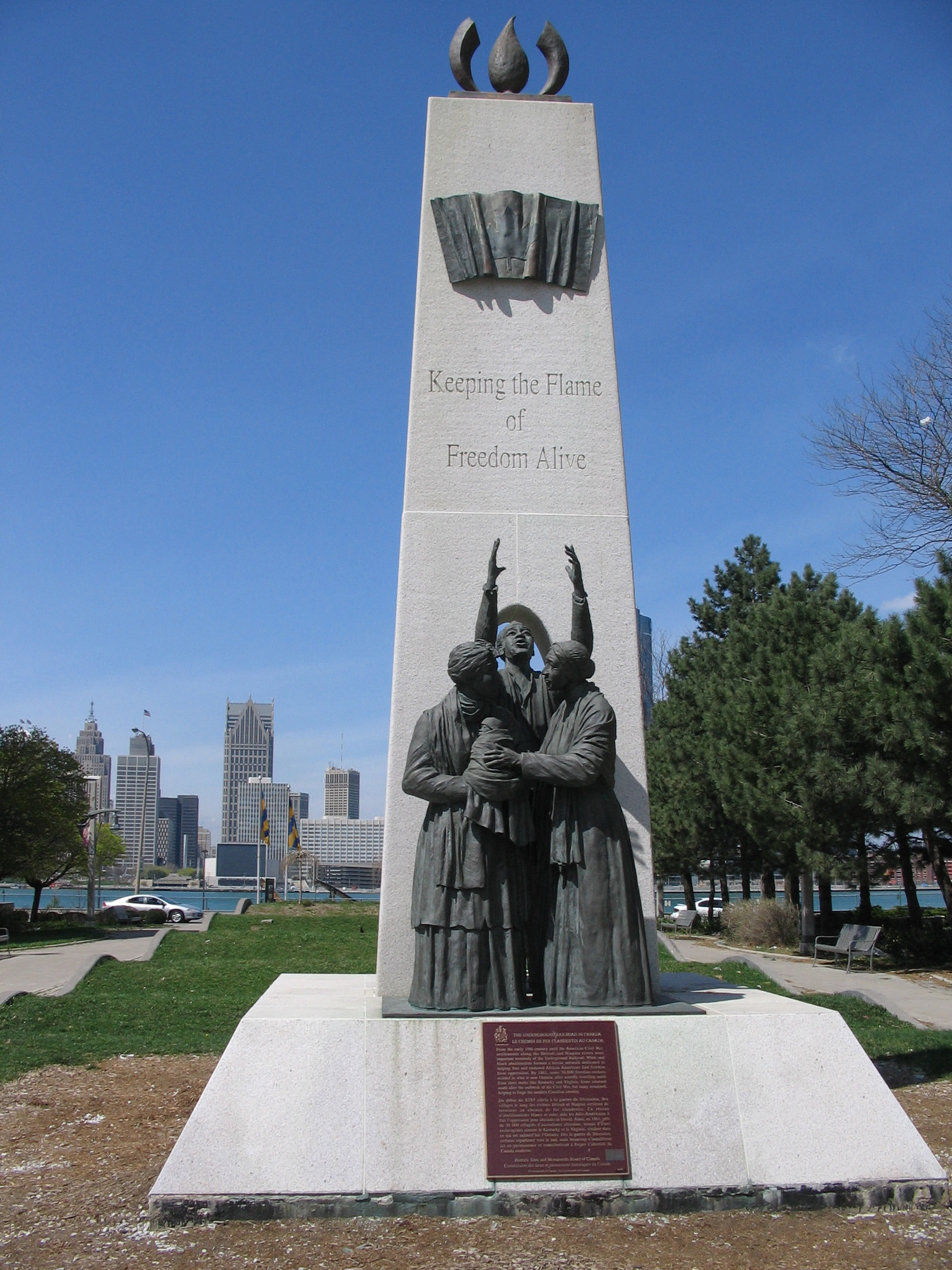
"Keeping the Flames of Freedom Alive", Underground Railroad Monument in Windsor, Ontario, Canada. Detroit, Michigan is in the background.

The Act Against Slavery of 1793 stated that any enslaved person would become free on arrival in Upper Canada. A network of routes led from the United States to Upper and Lower Canada.

=== Ontario ===
1. Amherstburg Freedom Museum – Amherstburg. The museum uses historical artifacts, Black heritage exhibits, and video presentations to share the story of how Africans were forced into slavery and then made their way to Canada.
2. Fort Malden – Amherstburg One of the routes to Ontario was to cross Lake Erie from Sandusky, Ohio to Fort Malden. Another route to Fort Malden was traveling across the Detroit River into Canada and then across to Amherstburg. A number of fugitive slaves lived in the area and Isaac J. Rice established himself as a missionary, operating a school for black children.
3. Buxton National Historic Site and Elgin settlement – Chatham, Ontario The Elgin settlement was established by a Presbyterian minister, Reverend William King, with 15 former slaves on November 28, 1849. King came from Ohio, where he inherited fourteen enslaved people from his father-in-law, acquired another, and set them all free. King intended the Elgin settlement to a refuge for runaway enslaved people. The Buxton Mission was established at the settlement.
4. Uncle Tom's Cabin Historic Site and Dawn Settlement – Dresden. Rev. Josiah Henson, a former enslaved man who fled slavery via the Underground Railroad with his wife Nancy and their children, was a cofounder of the Dawn Settlement in 1841. Dawn Settlement was designed to be a community for black refugees, where children and adults could receive an education and develop skills so that they could prosper. They exported tobacco, grain, and black walnut lumber to the United States and Britain.
5. John R. Park Homestead Conservation Area – Essex. The Park Homestead was a station on the Underground Railroad.
6. John Freeman Walls Historic Site – Lakeshore. John Freeman Walls, left his enslavers in North Carolina and settled in Canada. The Refugee Home Society supplied the money to buy land and he built a cabin. Church services were held there before the Puce Baptist Church was built. It was also a terminal stop on the Underground Railroad. Walls and his family stayed in Canada after the American Civil War.
7. Queen's Bush – Mapleton. Beginning in 1820, African American pioneers settled in the open lands of Queen's Bush. More than 1,500 blacks set up farms and created a community with churches and Mount Pleasant and Mount Hope schools, which were taught by American missionaries.
8. St. Catharines – Harriet Tubman lived in St. Catharines and attended the Salem Chapel for ten years. After she freed herself from slavery, she helped other enslaved people reach freedom in Canada. The town was a final stop on the Underground Railroad for many people.
9. Sandwich First Baptist Church – Windsor. The church was built just over the border from the United States in Windsor, Ontario by blacks who came to Canada to live free. For its role in the lives of its congregants and as a sanctuary for fugitive slaves, it was designated a National Historic Site in 1999.

=== Nova Scotia ===
African-American people settled in Nova Scotia since 1749.

1. Birchtown National Historic Site – Birchtown. It was a settlement of black people from Colonial America, who served the British during the American Revolutionary War in exchange for their freedom. Birchtown was the largest community of free black people in British North America during the late 18th century.
2. Africville – Halifax. Black people settled in Africville beginning in 1848. Black residents did not have the same services as white people, like clean water and sewers, and lived on land that was not arable. Some were able to make a living for themselves and build a community with a Baptist church, a school, stores, and a post office. A plan was initiated to relocate families and raze the site of the town.

== United States ==
=== Colorado ===
1. Barney L. Ford Building — Denver, associated with escaped slave Barney Ford, who became a quite successful businessman and led political action towards Black voting rights in Colorado. He used the Underground Railroad (UGRR) to flee slavery and supported UGRR activities.

=== Connecticut ===
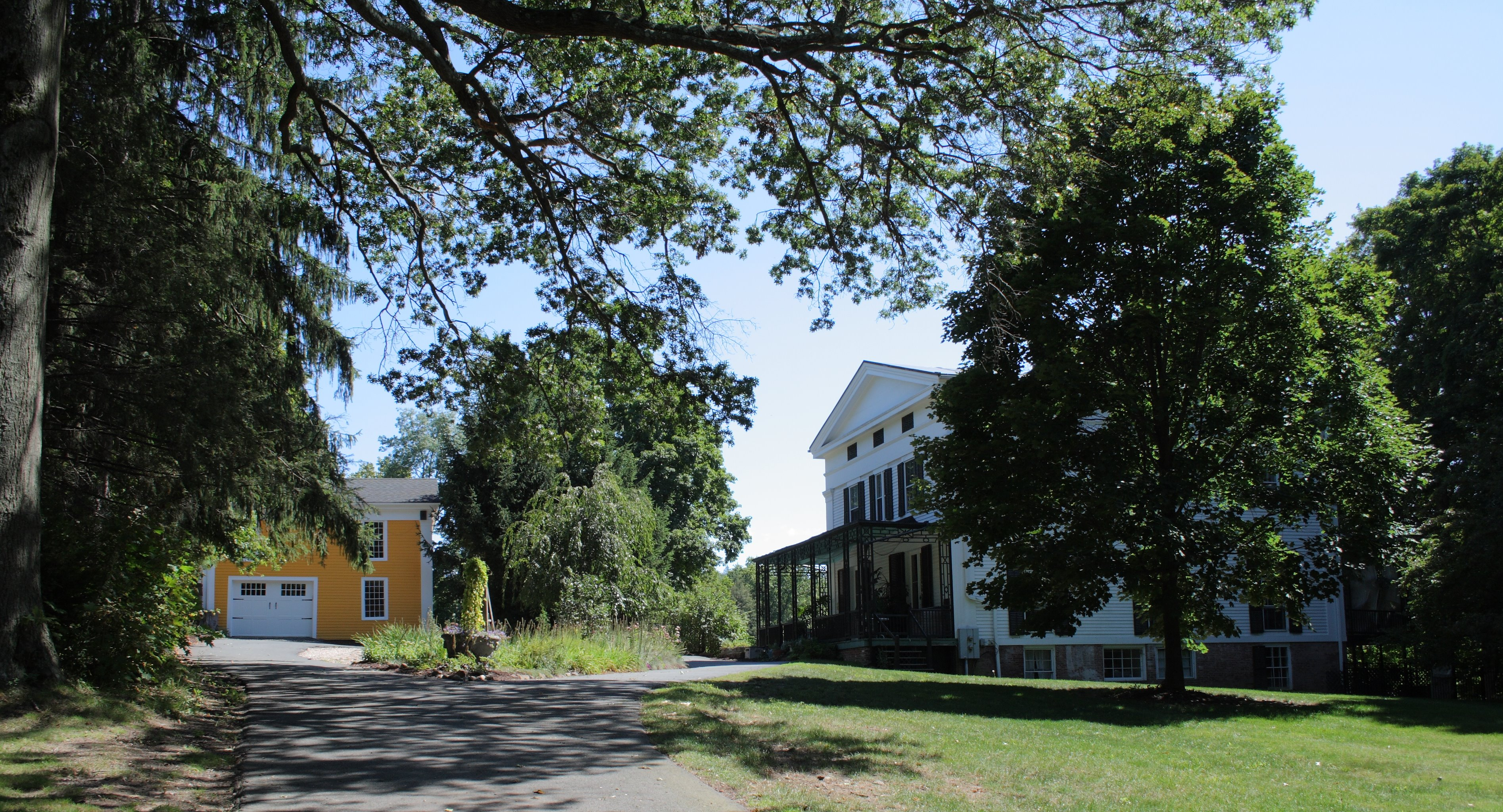
Austin F. Williams Carriagehouse and House, Farmington

1. Francis Gillette House — Bloomfield
2. Austin F. Williams Carriagehouse and House — Farmington. Built in the mid-19th century, the property was designated a National Historic Landmark for the role it played in the celebrated case of the Amistad Africans, and as a "station" on the Underground Railroad.
3. First Church of Christ, Congregational — Farmington The church was a hub of the Underground Railroad, and became involved in the celebrated case of the African slaves who revolted on the Spanish vessel La Amistad. When the Africans who had participated in the revolt were released in 1841, they came to Farmington.
4. Polly and William Wakeman House — Wilton. The Wakemans were among a group of abolitionists in Wilton who helped runaway slaves. Underneath their house was a tunnel that was accessed by a trap door. They took people on late-night trips to neighboring towns on the Underground Railroad.

=== Delaware ===
UGRR Sites in Delaware
1. Camden Friends Meetinghouse — Camden Quaker meeting house (built in 1806) of Camden Monthly Meeting, several of whose members were active in the Underground Railroad, including John Hunn, who is buried in its cemetery.
2. John Dickinson Plantation — Dover
3. New Castle Court House — New Castle
4. Appoquinimink Friends Meetinghouse — Odessa
5. Corbit–Sharp House — Odessa
6. The Tilly Escape site, Gateway to Freedom: Harriet Tubman's Daring Route through Seaford — Seaford
7. Friends Meeting House — Wilmington
8. Thomas Garrett House — Wilmington

=== District of Columbia ===
1. Blanche K. Bruce House
2. Camp Greene and Contraband Camp
3. Frederick Douglass National Historic Site
4. Howard University, Moorland-Spingarn Research Center
5. Leonard Grimes Property Site
6. Mary Ann Shadd Cary House
7. Pearl incident at 7th Street Dock

=== Florida ===
1. Negro Fort, also known as British Fort and Fort Gadsden — near Sumatra, Franklin County
2. Fort Mosé — St. John's County

=== Georgia ===
1. First African Baptist Church — Savannah
2. Dr. Robert Collins House - William and Ellen Craft Escape Site (NRHP site) — Macon

=== Illinois ===
UGRR Sites in Illinois
1. Old Rock House — Alton
2. New Philadelphia Town Site — Barry
3. Quinn Chapel AME Church — Brooklyn
4. Lucius Read House — Byron
5. Galesburg Colony UGRR Freedom Station at Knox College — Galesburg
6. Beecher Hall, Illinois College — Jacksonville
7. Graue Mill — Oak Brook
8. Dr. Hiram Rutherford House and Office — Oakland
9. Owen Lovejoy House — Princeton
10. John Hossack House — Ottawa
11. Dr. Richard Eells House — Quincy
12. Maple Lane (Reverend Asa Turner House) – Quincy
13. Mission Institute Number One – Quincy
14. Mission Institute Number Two – Quincy
15. Oakland (Dr. David Nelson House) – Quincy
16. Blanchard Hall, Wheaton College — Wheaton
17. Thede Home - Geneseo Historical Museum — Geneseo

=== Indiana ===
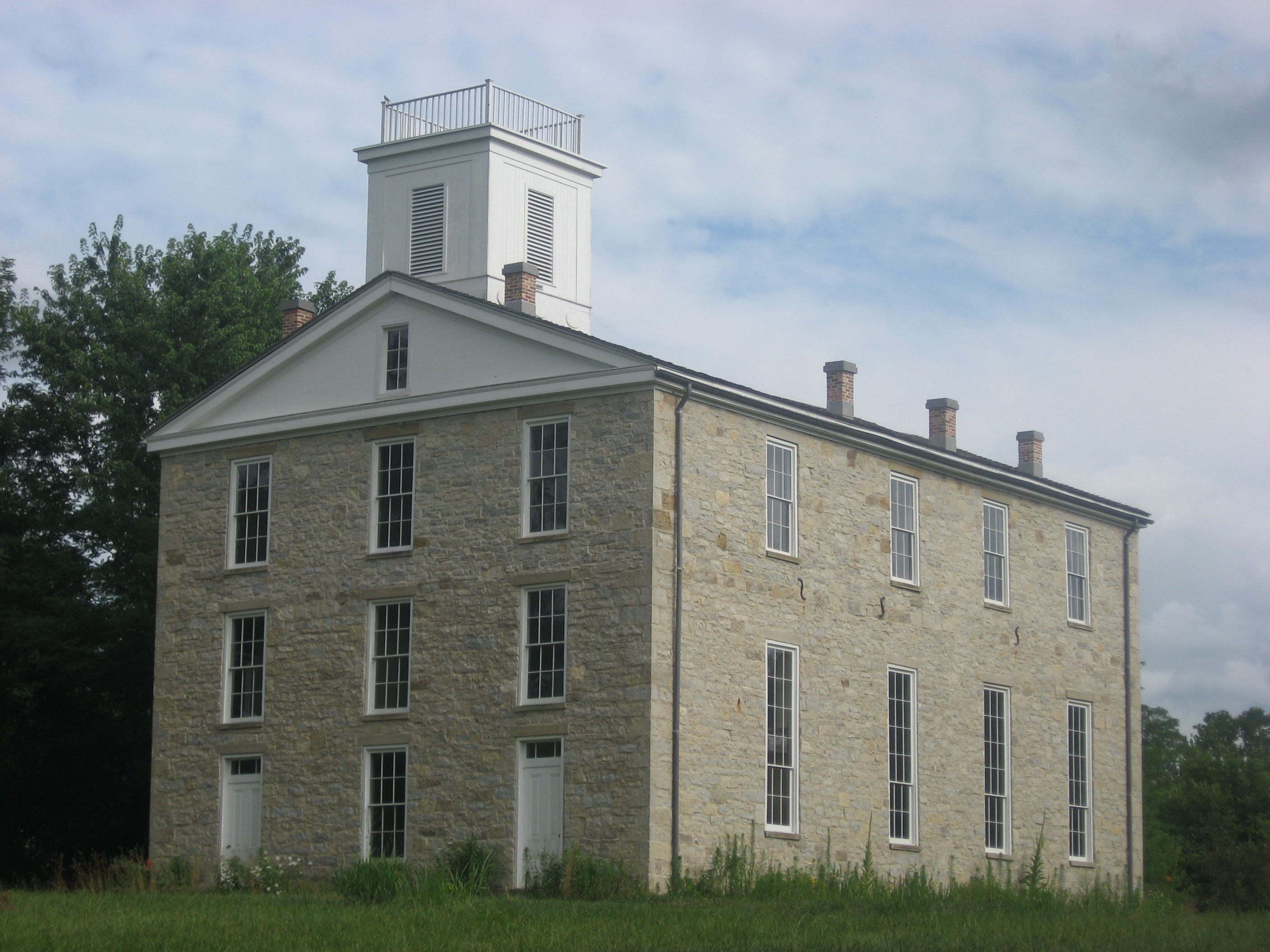
Eleutherian College, Lancaster, Indiana built in 1856

1. Levi Coffin House — Fountain City
2. Bethel AME Church — Indianapolis
3. Eleutherian College Classroom and Chapel Building — Lancaster
4. Lyman and Asenath Hoyt House — Madison
5. Madison Historic District — Madison
6. Town Clock Church (now Second Baptist Church) — New Albany
7. Quinn House, within Old Richmond Historic District — Richmond
8. Phanuel Lutheran Church — Southeastern Fountain County

=== Iowa ===
1. First Congregational Church — Burlington
2. Horace Anthony House — Camanche
3. Reverend George B. Hitchcock House — Lewis vicinity
4. Henderson Lewelling House — Salem
5. Todd House — Tabor
6. Jordan House — West Des Moines

=== Kansas ===
1. Fort Scott National Historic Site — Bourbon County
2. John Brown Cabin — Osawatomie

=== Maine ===
1. Harriet Beecher Stowe House — Brunswick
2. Abyssinian Meeting House — Portland
3. Maple Grove Friends Church — Fort Fairfield
4. Private Home - 55 High St, Brownville, ME

=== Maryland ===
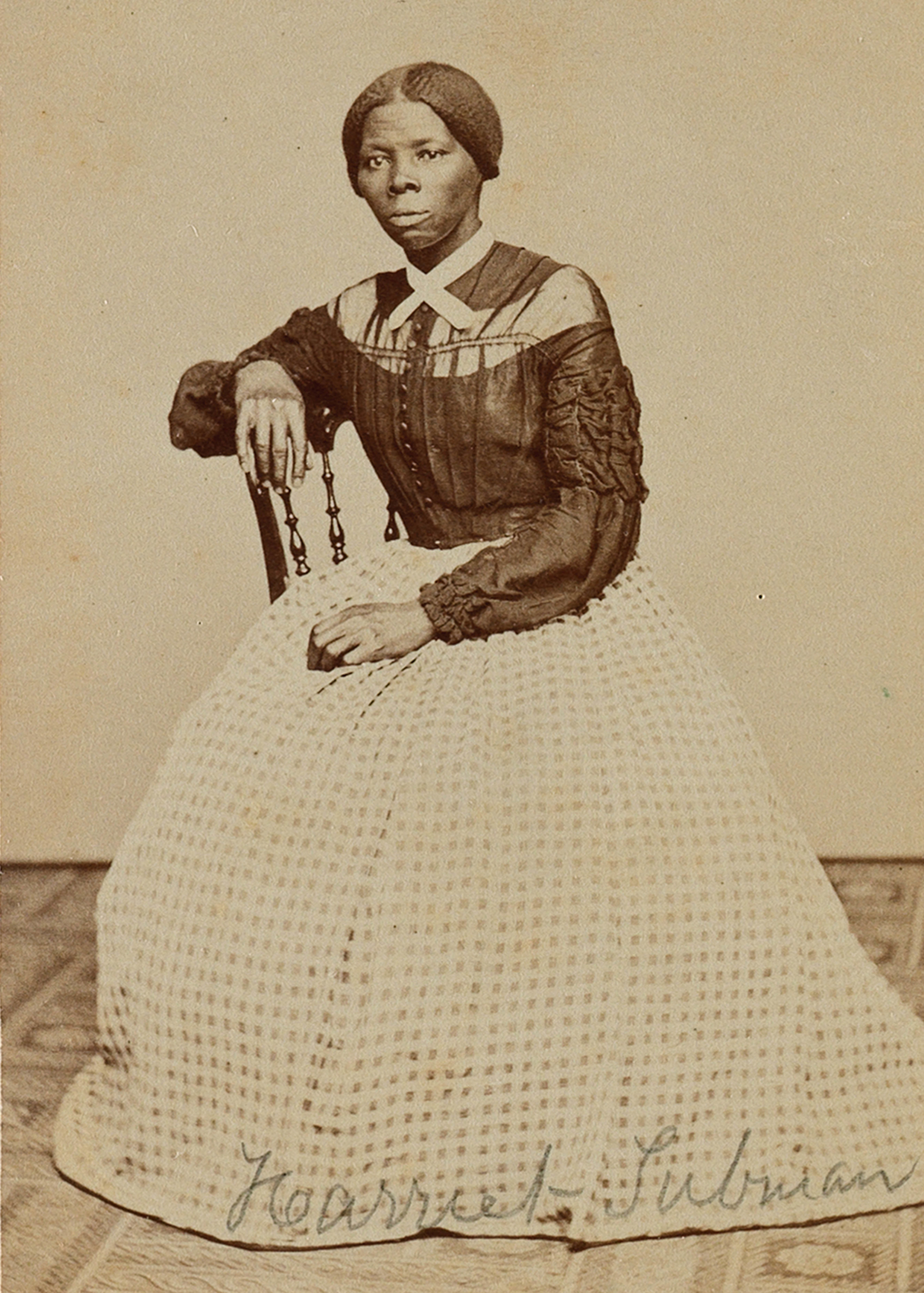
Harriet Tubman, c. 1868–1869, who was a significant figure in the history of the Underground Railroad. The Harriet Tubman Underground Railroad National Historical Park in Cambridge recognizes her efforts to free enslaved people

1. President Street Station — Baltimore
2. Harriet Tubman's birthplace — Dorchester County
3. Riley-Bolten House — North Bethesda
4. John Brown's Headquarters — Sample's Manor

=== Massachusetts ===
1. African American National Historic Site — Boston
2. William Lloyd Garrison House — Boston
3. Black Heritage Trail, including the Lewis and Harriet Hayden House — Boston
4. William Ingersoll Bowditch House — Brookline
5. Mount Auburn Cemetery — Cambridge
6. The Wayside — Concord
7. George Luther Stearns Estate — Medford
8. Nathan and Mary Johnson House — New Bedford
9. Jackson Homestead — Newton
10. Ross Farm — Northampton
11. Dorsey–Jones House — Northampton
12. Liberty Farm — Worcester

=== Michigan ===
1. Guy Beckley — Ann Arbor. Underground Railroad promoter and station master and anti-slavery lecturer. The Guy Beckley House is on the Underground Railroad Network to Freedom.
2. Erastus and Sarah Hussey — Battle Creek
3. Second Baptist Church — Detroit
4. Dr. Nathan M. Thomas House — Schoolcraft
5. Wright Modlin — Williamsville, Cass County. His house was a railroad station, but he often traveled south to the Ohio River (a border between the free and slave states) or into Kentucky where he found people escaping slavery and brought them up to Cass County. He was so successful that it angered Kentuckian slaveholders, who instigated the Kentucky raid on Cass County in 1847. He was also a central figure in The South Bend Fugitive Slave case.

=== Nebraska ===
1. Mayhew Cabin — Nebraska City

=== New Jersey ===
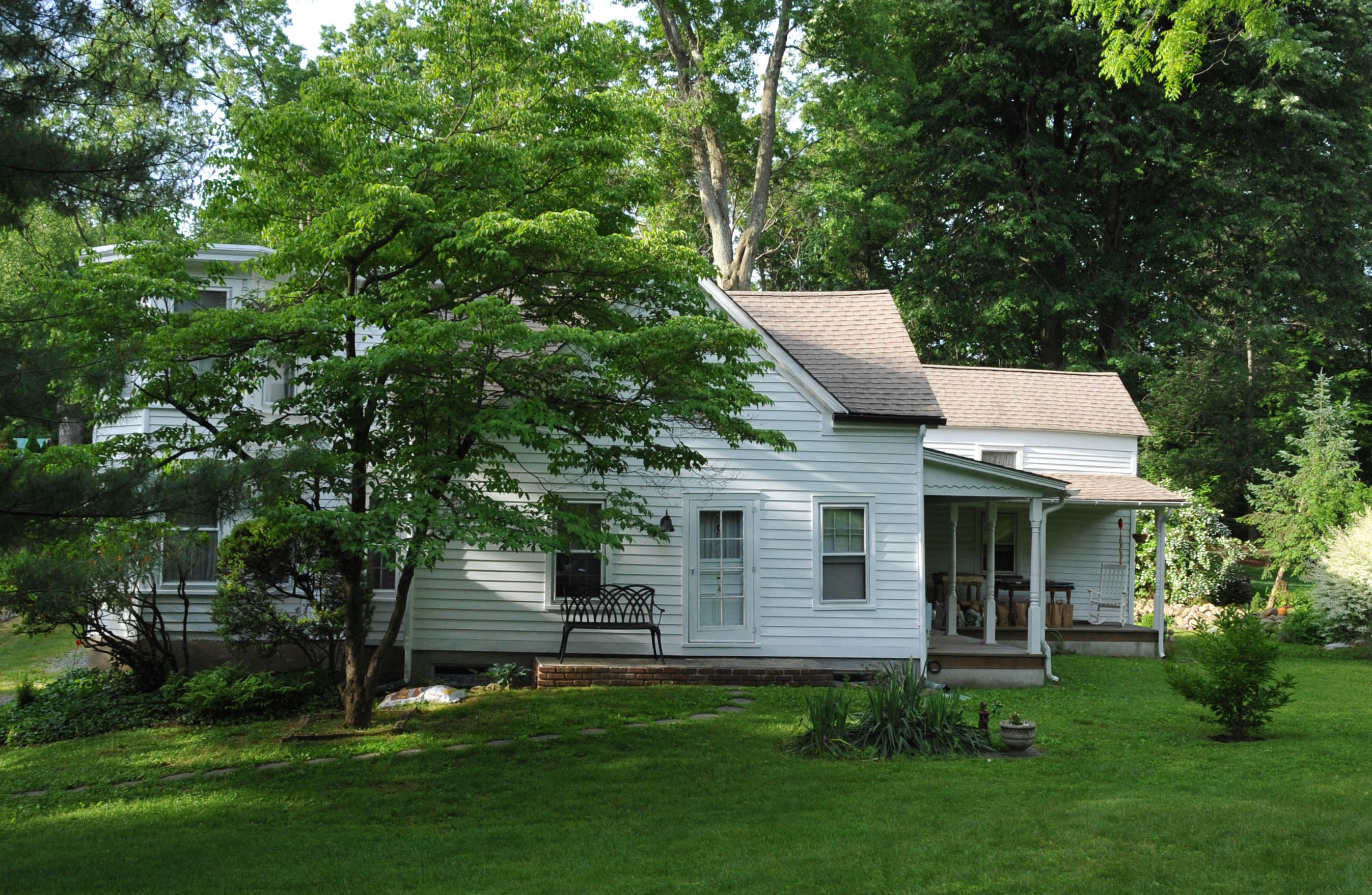
Grimes Homestead, Mountain Lakes, New Jersey

1. Holden Hilton House — Jersey City
2. Thomas Vreeland Jackson and John Vreeland Jackson house — Jersey City
3. Mott House — Lawnside Borough
4. Red Maple Farm — Monmouth Junction
5. Grimes Homestead — Mountain Lakes
6. Rhoads Chapel — Saddlertown, Haddon Township
7. Bethel AME Church — Springtown
8. Mortonson-Van Leer Log Cabin — Swedesboro
9. Mount Zion African Methodist Episcopal Church — Woolwich Township

=== New York ===
A few UGRR Sites in New York
1. Edwin Weyburn Goodwin — Albany
2. Stephen and Harriet Myers House — Albany
3. Allegany County network: Baylies Bassett — Alfred and others (including Henry Crandall Home — Almond; William Sortore Farm — Belmont); Marcus Lucas Home — Corning; Thatcher Brothers — Hornell, McBurney House — Canisteo (now in town of Hornellsville); William Knight — Scio
4. Harriet Tubman House and Thompson AME Zion Church — Auburn
5. North Star Underground Railroad Museum — Ausable Chasm
6. Michigan Street Baptist Church — Buffalo
7. Cadiz, Franklinville area network: Merlin Mead House and others, including John Burlingame, Alfred Rice, Isaac Searle, and the owner of the Stagecoach Inn
8. McClew Farm at Murphy Orchards — Burt
9. St. James AME Zion Church — Ithaca
10. John Brown Farm State Historic Site — Lake Placid
11. Starr Clock Tinshop — Mexico
12. Abolitionist Place — New York City: Brooklyn. Abolitionist Place is a section of Duffield Street in downtown Brooklyn that used to be a center of anti-slavery and Underground Railroad activity. New York City was one of the busiest ports in the world in the 19th century. Some freedom seekers traveled aboard ships amongst cargo, like tobacco or cotton from the Southern United States and arrived in Brooklyn a few blocks away from Abolitionist Place. Underground Railroad conductors helped these freedom seekers, as well as people who traveled north on the Underground Railroad. They were provided needed shelter, like at the Plymouth Church of the Pilgrims; clothing; and food.
13. Plymouth Church of the Pilgrims — New York City: Brooklyn
14. Niagara Falls Underground Railroad Heritage Center — Niagara Falls
15. Chappaqua Friends Meeting House - Chappaqua, New York
16. Buckout-Jones Building — Oswego
17. Edwin W. and Charlotte Clarke House — Oswego
18. Hamilton and Rhoda Littlefield House — Oswego
19. John B. and Lydia Edwards House — Oswego
20. John Jay Homestead - Bedford/Katonah
21. Orson Ames House — Mexico, Oswego County
22. Oswego Market House — Oswego
23. Oswego School District Public Library (presumably the Oswego City Library) — Oswego
24. Richardson-Bates House Museum — Oswego
25. Tudor E. Grant — Oswego
26. Gerrit Smith Estate and Land Office — Peterboro
27. Smithfield Community Center — Peterboro, formerly a church; first meeting of New York Anti-Slavery Society held there; houses National Abolition Hall of Fame and Museum.
28. Samuel and Elizabeth Cuyler House Site — Pultneyville
29. Foster Memorial AME Zion Church — Tarrytown
30. Eber Pettit Home - Versailles
31. African Methodist Episcopal Zion Church - Rochester, New York. Escaping enslaved people were hidden under the pulpit and in hollow pews. Frederick Douglass, Amy and Isaac Post, Jacob P. Morris, and other Rochester Underground Railroad organizers were associated with the site.

=== North Carolina ===
1. Guilford College Woods meeting place, Guilford College — Greensboro
2. Freedmen's Colony of Roanoke Island Network to Freedom site — Manteo, Outer Banks

=== Ohio ===
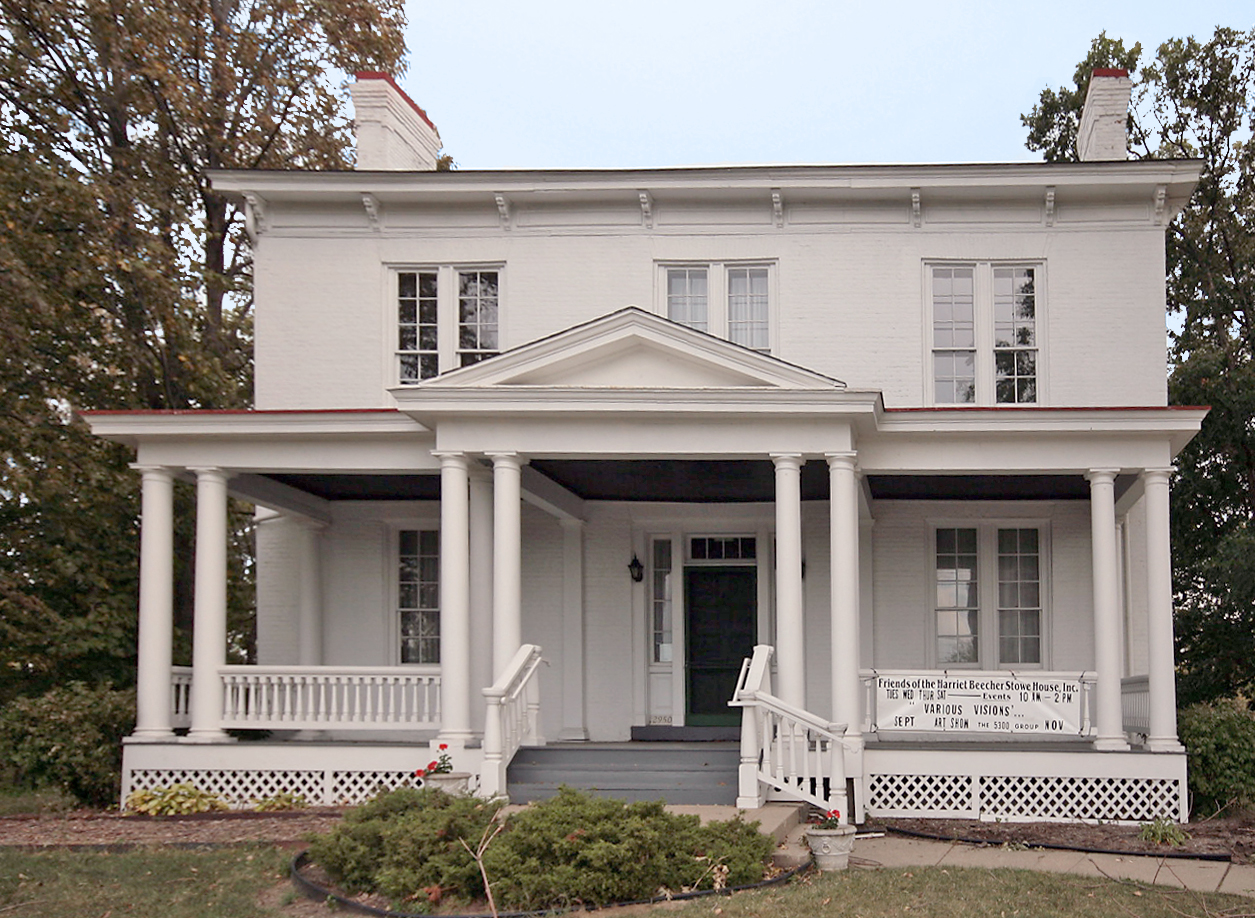
Harriet Beecher Stowe House in Cincinnati, Ohio

1. Col. William Hubbard House — Ashtabula
2. Captain Jonathan Stone House — Belpre
3. Harriet Beecher Stowe House — Cincinnati
4. House of Peter and Sarah M. Fossett — Cincinnati / Cumminsville
5. Samuel and Sally Wilson House — Cincinnati
6. James and Sophia Clemens Farmstead — Greenville
7. Sawyer–Curtis House — Little Hocking
8. Mount Pleasant Historic District — Mt. Pleasant
9. Reuben Benedict House — Marengo
10. Spring Hill — Massillon
11. Wilson Bruce Evans House — Oberlin
12. John P. Parker House — Ripley
13. John Rankin House — Ripley
14. Daniel Howell Hise House — Salem
15. Rush R. Sloane House — Sandusky
16. George W. Adams House / Prospect Place — Trinway
17. Iberia — Washington Township, Morrow County
18. Putnam Historic District — Zanesville

=== Pennsylvania ===
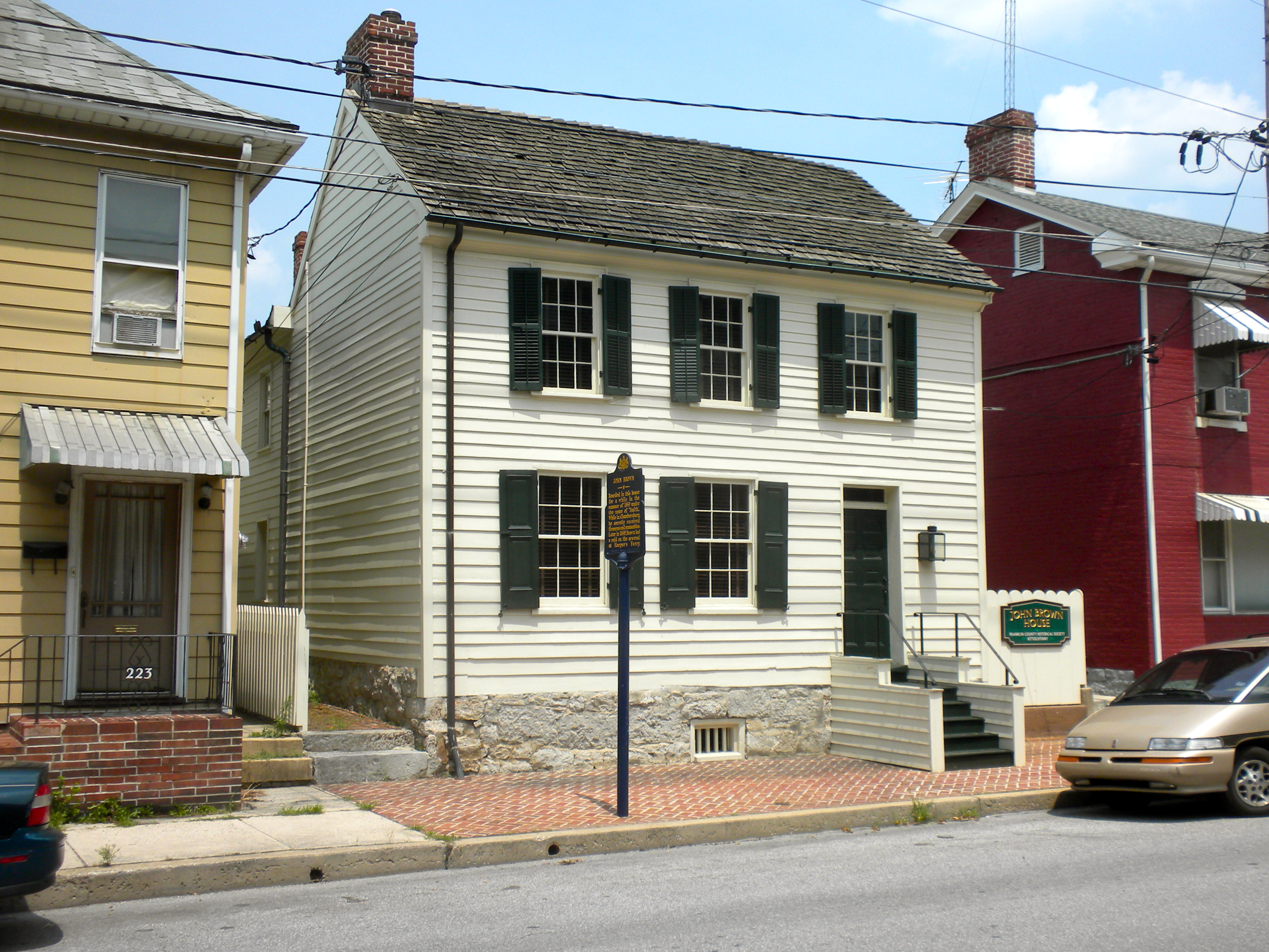
John Brown House in Chambersburg

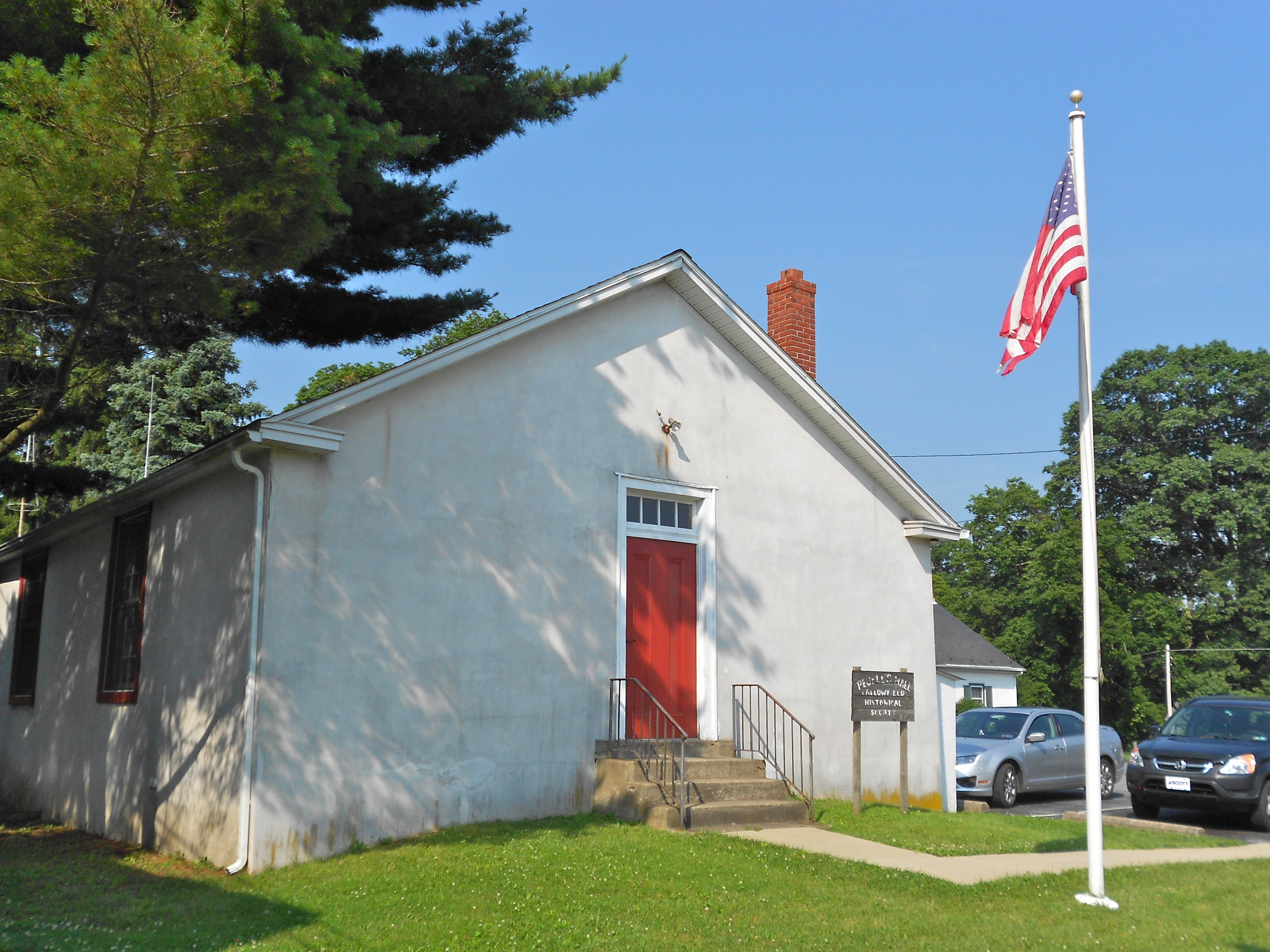
People's Hall in Ercildoun

1. Kaufman's Station — Boiling Springs
2. Oakdale — Chadds Ford
3. John Brown House — Chambersburg
4. Dobbin House — Gettysburg
5. Thaddeus Stevens Home and Law Office – Lancaster
6. Johnson House — Philadelphia
7. Hosanna Meeting House — Chester County
8. Liberty Bell, Independence National Historical Park — Philadelphia
9. White Horse Farm — Phoenixville
10. Hovenden House, Barn and Abolition Hall — Plymouth Meeting
11. Bethel AME Zion Church — Reading
12. F. Julius LeMoyne House — Washington
13. William Goodrich House — York
14. Eusebius Barnard House — Pocopson
15. Van Leer Cabin — Tredyffrin
16. Africa / Brownsville — Fayetteville

=== Rhode Island ===
1. Isaac Rice Homestead — Newport

=== Tennessee ===
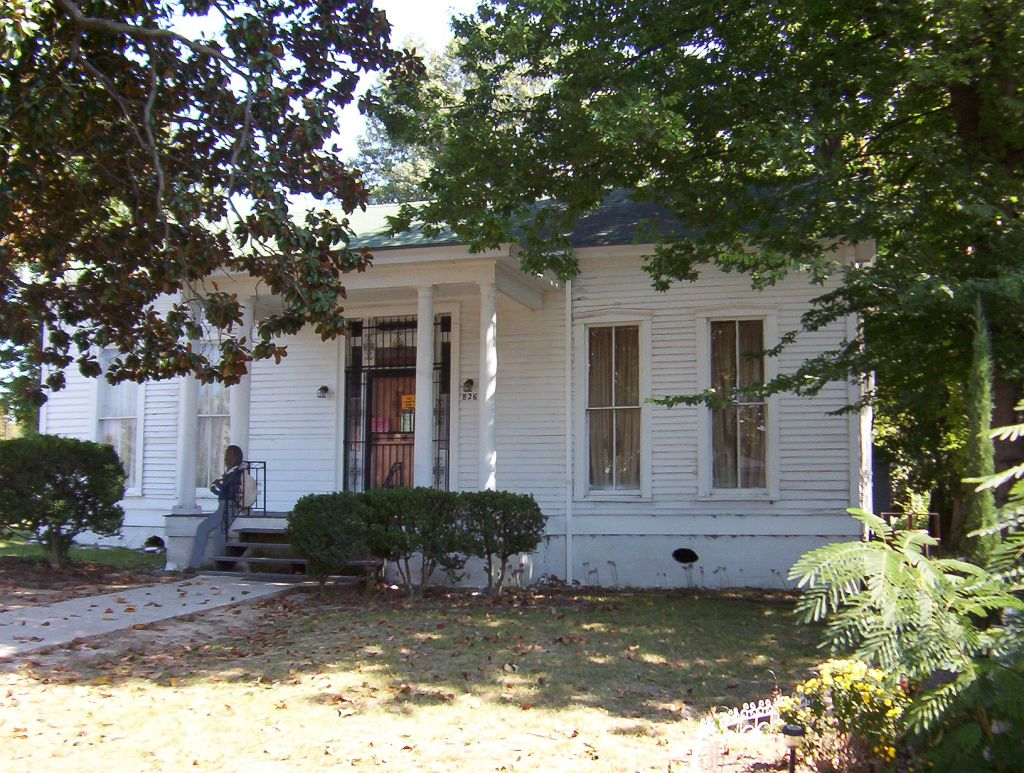
Burkle Estate (Slavehaven) in Memphis, Tennessee.

1. Burkle Estate was possibly a station and is now Slave Haven Underground Railroad Museum — Memphis
2. Hunt-Phelan House — Memphis

=== Texas ===
1. Matilda and Nathaniel Jackson
2. Silvia and John Webber

=== Vermont ===
1. Rowland E. Robinson House, Rokeby — Ferrisburgh

=== Virgin Islands ===
1. Annaberg Sugar Plantation and School — St. John

=== Virginia ===
1. Bruin's Slave Jail — Alexandria
2. Rochelle–Prince House / Nat Turner Historic District — Courtland
3. Moncure Conway House — Falmouth
4. Theodore Roosevelt Island — Rosslyn
5. Fort Monroe — Hampton

=== West Virginia ===
1. Z. D. Ramsdell House — Ceredo
2. Jefferson County Courthouse — Charles Town
3. Harpers Ferry National Historical Park — Harpers Ferry
4. Wheeling Hotel — Wheeling

=== Wisconsin ===
1. Milton House — Milton
2. Joshua Glover — Milwaukee
3. Lyman Goodnow — Waukesha. Conductor, led 16-year-old Caroline Quarlls, the first known freedom seeker along Wisconsin's Underground Railroad, from Wisconsin to Canada.

== Other articles and references ==
=== See also ===
- Index: Underground Railroad locations
- National Underground Railroad Freedom Center
- The Underground Railroad Records
- Underground Railroad Bicycle Route

=== Bibliography ===
- Snodgrass, Mary Ellen (2008). The Underground Railroad : an encyclopedia of people, places, and operations. Armonk, New York: M.E. Sharpe. ISBN 978-0-7656-8093-8.

=== External links ===
- Map of Underground Railroad locations
- A Photographic Journey Along the Underground Railroad
- American abolitionists
