= Hossack =

Hossack is a surname. Notable people with the surname include:

- Allison Hossack, Canadian actress
- Anthony Hossack, English footballer
- Darren Hossack, Australian race car driver
- Graeme Hossack, Canadian lacrosse player
- John Hossack, Scottish-American abolitionist
- Michael Hossack, American musician
- Norman Hossack, motor sport racing and electronics engineer

== See also ==
- Hossack River, river in New Zealand
- John Hossack House, historic house in Illinois
- William Hossak, Canadian politician
