= Putnam Historic District =

- U.S. National Register of Historic Places
- U.S. Historic district
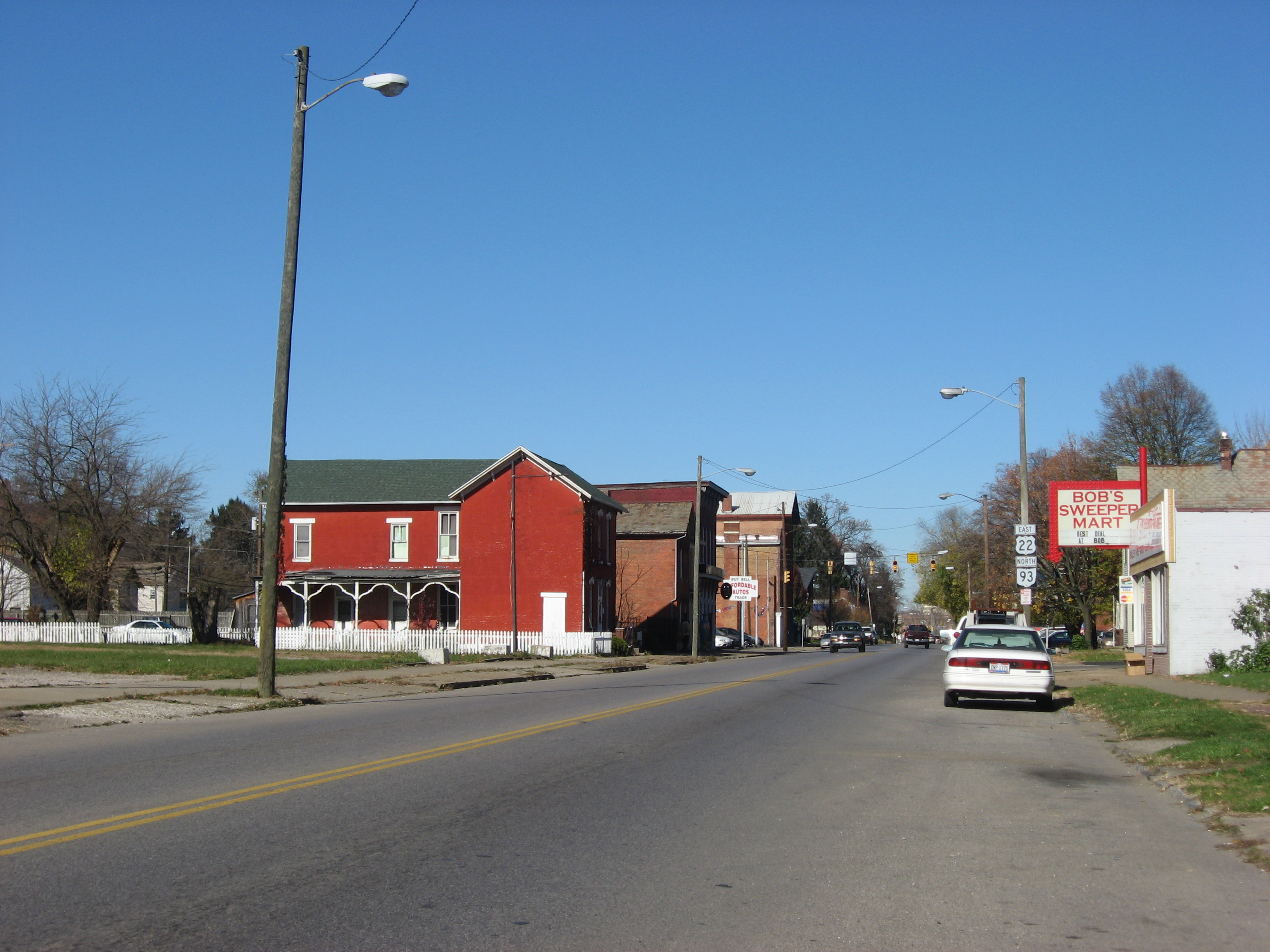

- Location within Ohio
- Location: Zanesville, Ohio
- Coordinates: 39°55′55″N 82°0′26″W
- Built: 19th century
- Architectural style: Federal, Greek Revival
- NRHP reference No.: 75001511
- Added to NRHP: June 30, 1975

Putnam Historic District, located in Zanesville, Ohio, was an important center of Underground Railroad traffic and home to a number of abolitionists. The district, with private residences and other key buildings important in the fight against slavery, lies between the Pennsylvania Central Railroad, Van Buren Street, and Muskingum River. It became a historic district of the National Register of Historic Places in 1975.

== History ==
Springfield was the original name of the settlement, which was established about 1800. In 1814, it was named Putnam and in 1872 it was annexed to Zanesville.

The historic district includes 13 contributing buildings on 45 acres (0.18 km^{2}). The district encompasses twelve blocks, containing 168 main structures, about 118 of which were built in the 19th century. Most of them were built between 1865 and 1900, during the Victorian age. The remaining buildings were primarily built in the first two decades of the 20th century.

The Stone Academy was built in 1809 with the intention of being the state capital building. It was built by Levi Whipple, Ebenezer Buckingham, and Dr. Increase Mathews. Putnam was its own town then, across the Muskingum River from Zanesville, which also built a state capital building. From 1810 to 1812, Zanesville was the state's capital.

Two Ohio Abolition Society conventions were held at the Stone Academy in 1835 and 1839. The academy was attacked both times by anti-abolitionists from Zaneville. Major Horace Nye presided over the convention in 1839. Lucinda Belknap Nye, his wife, was the president of the Muskingum County Anti-Slavery Society. They lived at 228 Adams Street.

The Putnam Presbyterian Church is a brick Gothic Revival church built in 1835. The first pastor, William Beecher, was the brother of Harriet Beecher Stowe. Abolitionists, like Frederick Douglass, spoke at the church. A number of the members of the church were Underground Railroad conductors. Congregants met monthly to pray for the abolition of slavery.

George Guthrie's Greek Revival home served several times as an Underground Railroad station. On one occurrence, slaveholders ran through the streets of the town looking for three children, who were hidden in the attic. The home of George's brother A.A. Guthrie was also a station. Their brother Stephen helped people hide from slave hunters. William Harris, a black man, hid a woman and four children in his home until slave hunters were diverted to an abandoned mine, which provided the needed time to move them to a safer location.

The Stone Academy is now a museum operated by the Pioneer and Historical Society of Muskingum County. A brochure of a walking tour of the district is available at the Zanesville-Muskingum County Visitor's Bureau.

== See also ==
- List of Underground Railroad sites
