= James and Sophia Clemens Farmstead =

Historic house in Ohio, United States

- U.S. National Register of Historic Places
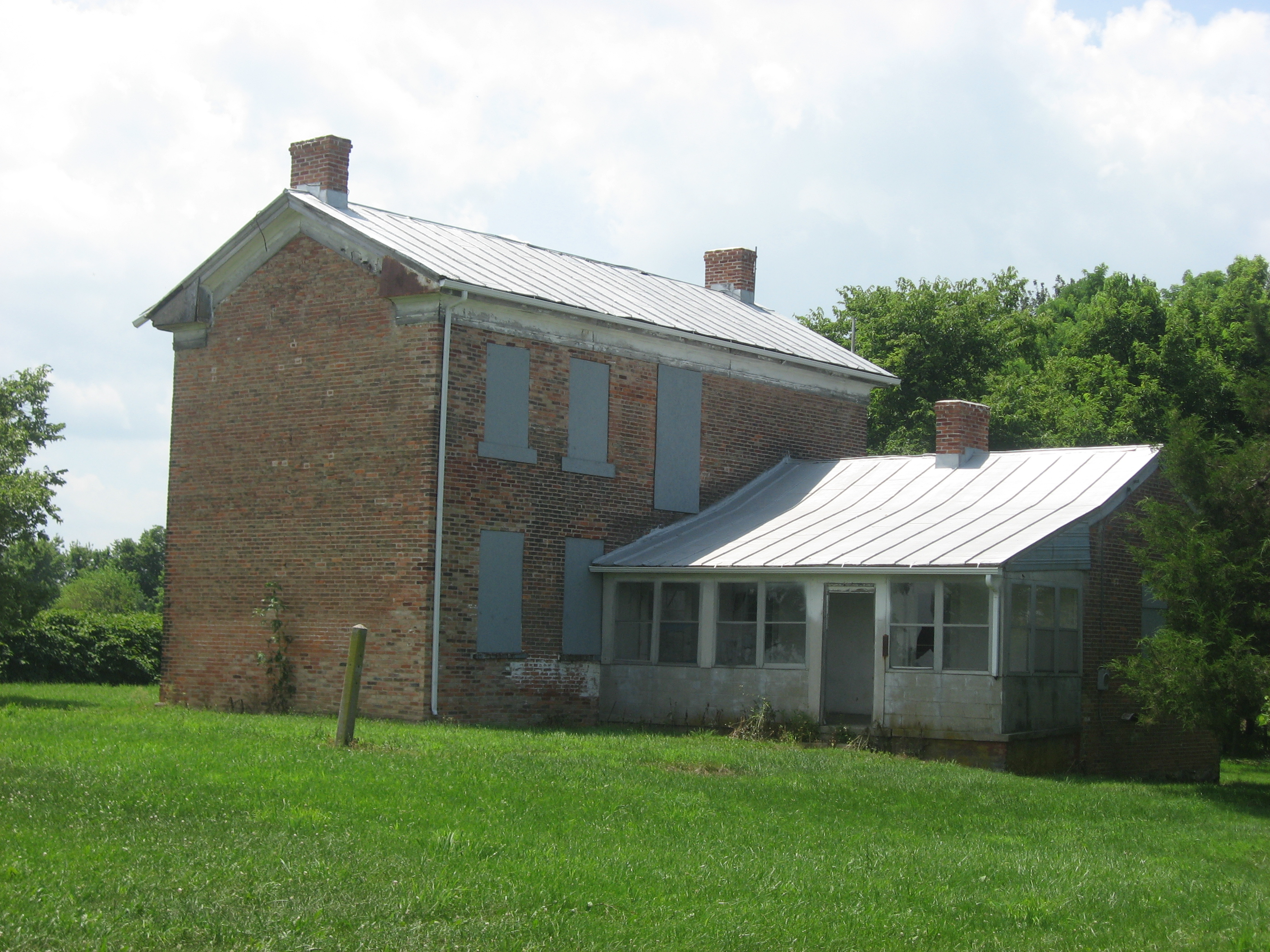
- Front and side of the farmhouse

- Location within Ohio Location within the United States
- Nearest city: 467 Stingley Rd., Palestine, Ohio
- Coordinates: 40°4′39″N 84°47′43″W
- Area: 4 acres (1.6 ha)
- Built: 1850
- Architectural style: I-house
- NRHP reference No.: 01000199
- Added to NRHP: March 15, 2001

The James and Sophia Clemens Farmstead is a historic farm situated in western Darke County, Ohio, United States. Located at 467 Stingley Road, approximately 1 mile (1.6 km) from the Indiana border, it is among the oldest remaining buildings of a small community of free African-Americans founded before the Civil War.

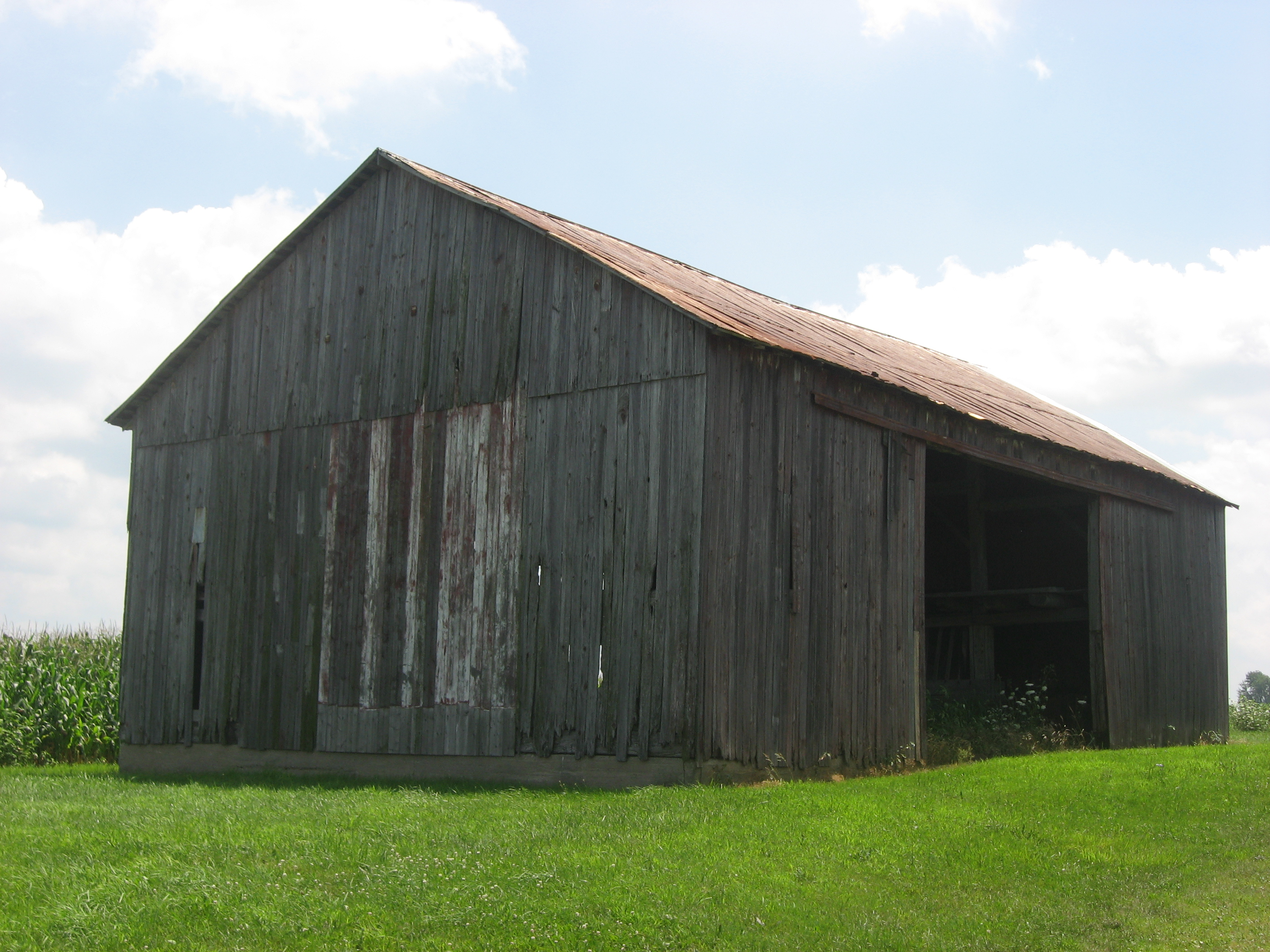
The Clemens Barn, located immediately east of the house

Natives of Rockingham County, Virginia, James and Sophia Clemens settled in Darke County in 1818 and became prosperous farmers. Their success led other former slaves to migrate to the vicinity, and a community known as "Longtown" (alternately "Tampico") gradually grew up in the vicinity of the Clemens farm. Over the years, the community became a center for the Underground Railroad, complete with a Quaker school known as the Union Literary Institute; among the movement's leaders in the community were the Clemens family.

The Clemens house itself was erected circa 1850 on land purchased in 1822. The two-story brick I-house rests on a limestone foundation and is covered with a tin roof. Though the house is presently uninhabited, a movement to restore the house and designate Longtown a state historic landmark began in the mid-2000s. The Clemens house itself has been designated a historic site, having been listed on the National Register of Historic Places in 2001, along with the other building on the property. It qualified for the Register both because of its place in local history and its association with James Clemens, who was seen as a significant individual in the history of Darke County.

== See also ==
- List of Underground Railroad sites
