= Harriet Tubman's birthplace =

Birthplace of American abolitionist

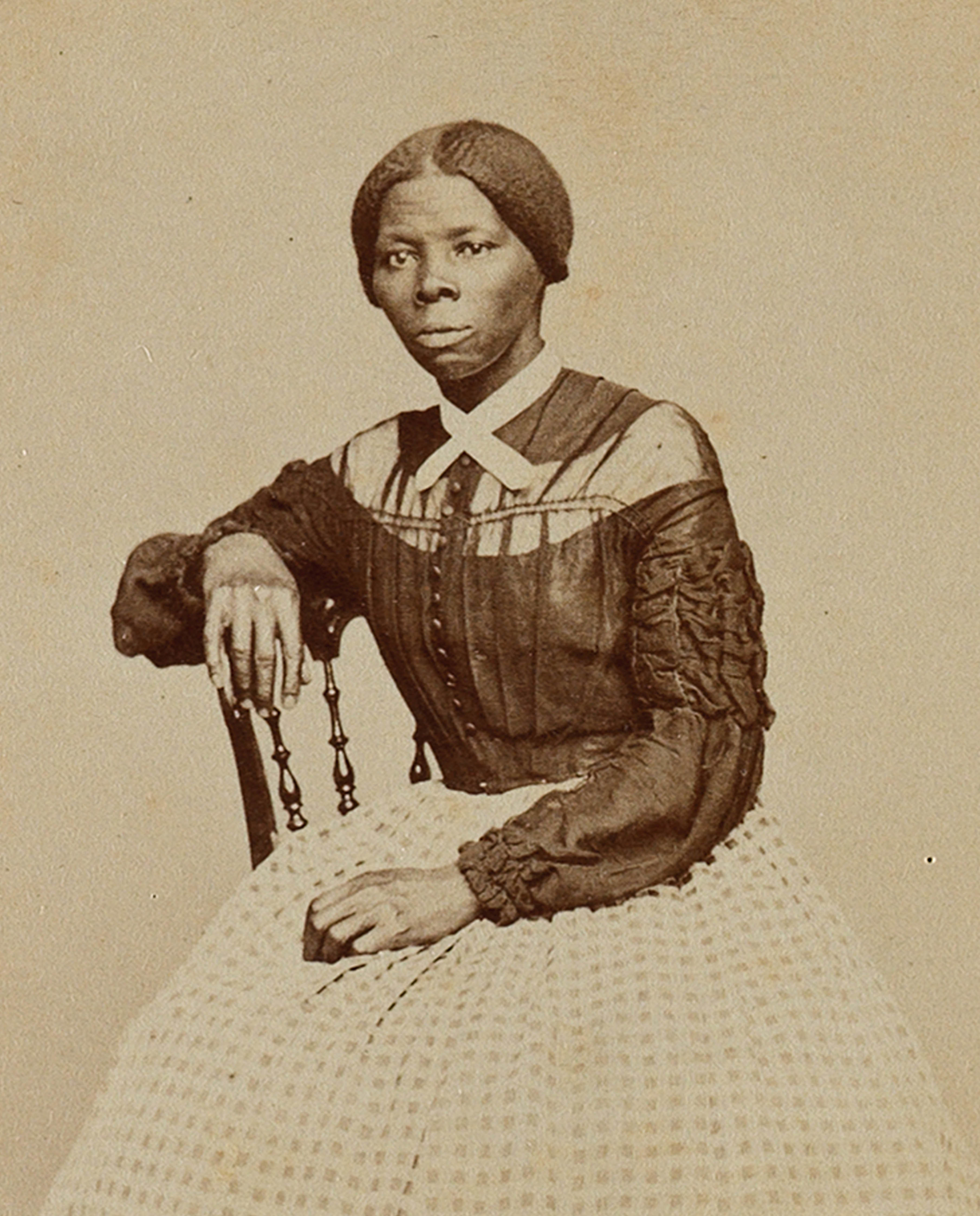
Harriet Tubman, ca. 1868–1869

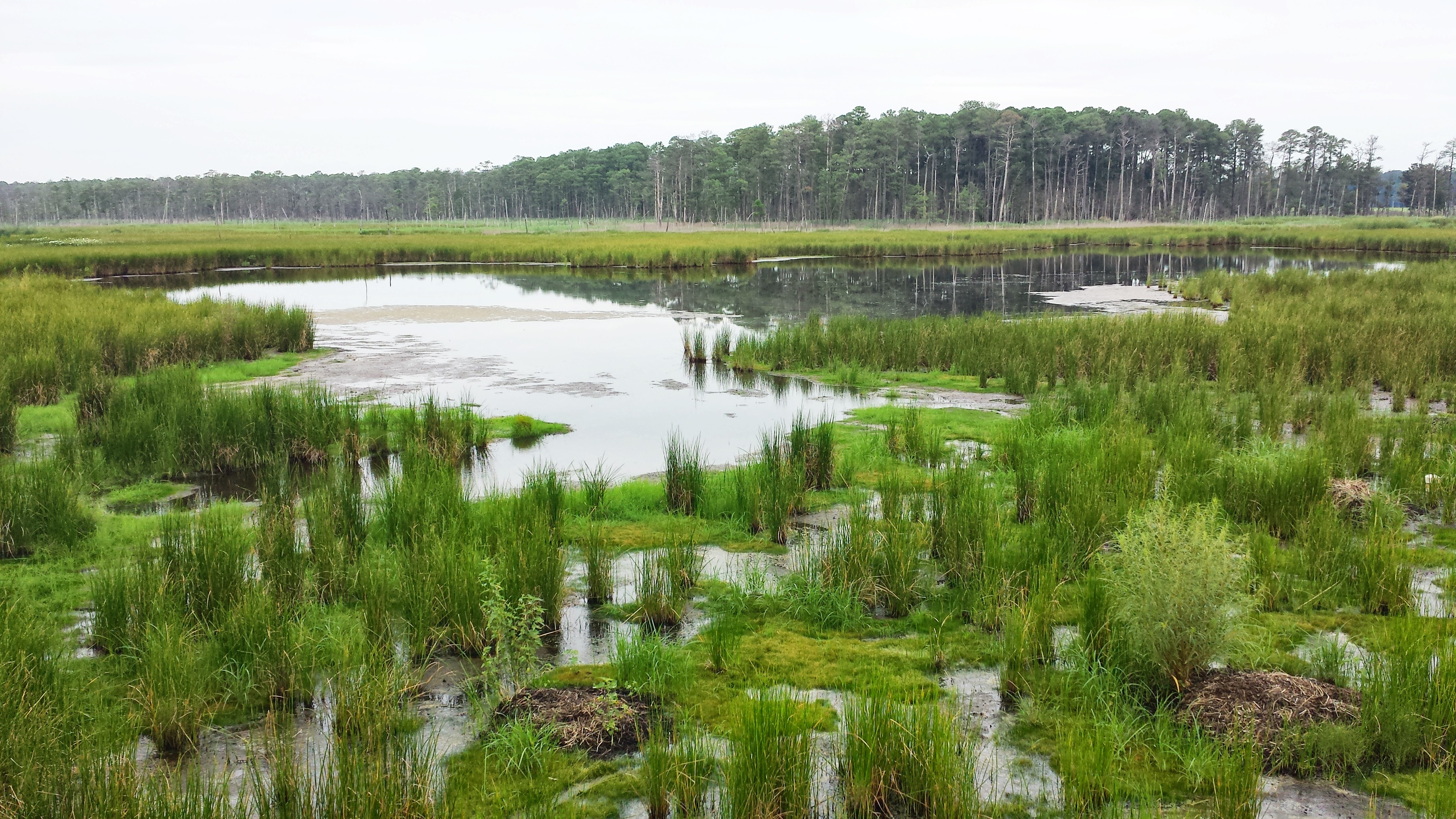
Blackwater National Wildlife Refuge marshland and forests

Harriet Tubman's birthplace is in Dorchester County, Maryland. Araminta Ross, the daughter of Benjamin (Ben) and Harriet (Rit) Greene Ross, was born into slavery in 1822 in her father's cabin. (Note: A historic marker, located on Maryland 397 near Bucktown states: "Tubman was called 'The Moses of Her People' because of her courageous work on the Underground Railroad. She helped more than 300 slaves escape to freedom." Some people take this to be a marker for her birthplace. The most recent information by historians is that she was born in 1822, in her father's cabin on Anthony Thompsom's farm at what is now Blackwater National Wildlife Refuge, and moved with her mother and siblings to the Brodess farm (near the placement of the marker) when she was several years of age. Further defining her year and place of birth, Anthony Thompson hired a midwife in March 1822 for Harriet "Rit" Ross, taken in conjunction with the timing of her sibling's life events. Dates of birth were typically not recorded for enslaved people. In addition, most parents were unable to record key events. They did not celebrate their birthdays.) It was located on the farm of Anthony Thompson at Peter's Neck, at the end of Harrisville Road, which is now part of the Blackwater National Wildlife Refuge. (Note: The coordinates are based upon this description. There is no United States Geological Survey (USGS) record for the Harriet Tubman birthplace. There is, though, a record for Peters Neck, which is 38°27′54.44″N 76°12′45.8″W)

After a few years, she lived on the Brodess farm with her mother and siblings. In the early 1840s, her father was emancipated and received 10 acres of land following Anthony Johnson's death. She was married in 1844 to John Tubman, at the same time, she changed her given name, becoming Harriet Tubman. Realizing she was to be sold following her enslaver's death, Tubman escaped in 1849, when she was 27 years of age. (Note: She may have escaped by following a trail or by following the Transquaking River north of Bucktown to Choptank River about 15 miles from the farm.) A conductor on the Underground Railroad, she made 13 return trips over 10 years to lead her parents, siblings, and friends to freedom.

In March 2021, archaeologists excavated what they determined to be the site of Ben Ross's cabin. They found artifacts from the 1800s, including broken dishware, glass, a button, and nails. (Note: Patricia C. Guida received the 2008 Heritage Researcher award for her research into the 2,167 acre farm owned by Anthony C. Thompson, which is mentioned in Harriet Tubman's autobiographies.) In April 2021, it was said that the site was to be added to the Harriet Tubman Underground Railroad Scenic Byway. It is a scenic drive with more than 30 stops over 125 miles.

== See also ==
- List of Underground Railroad sites
