= Fisher–Nash–Griggs House =

Historic house in Illinois, United States

- U.S. National Register of Historic Places
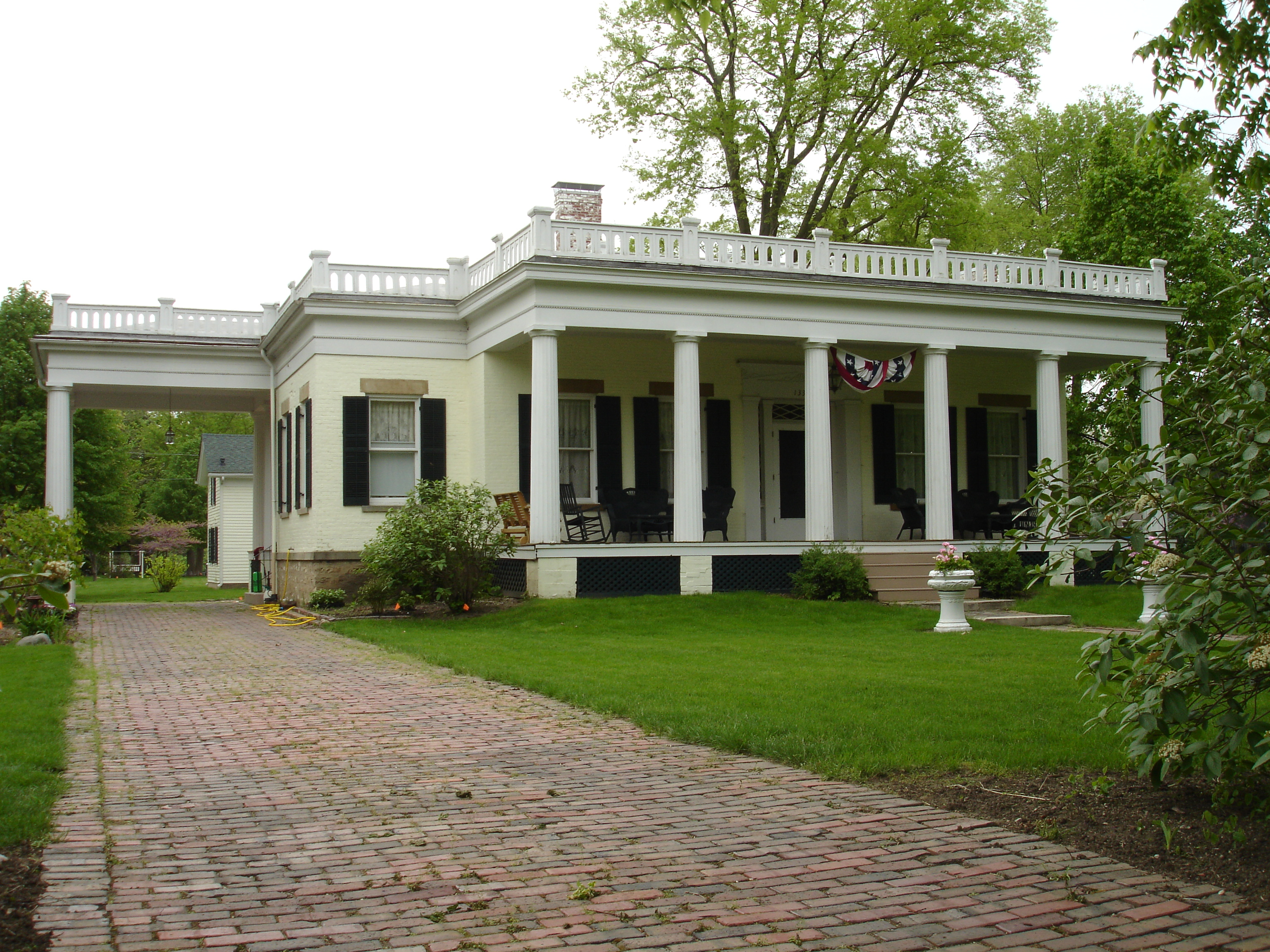

- Location within Illinois Location within the United States
- Interactive map showing the location of Fisher-Nash-Griggs House
- Location: 1333 Ottawa Ave., Ottawa, Illinois
- Coordinates: 41°20′28.5″N 88°51′31.3″W
- Area: 1.3 acres (0.53 ha)
- Built: 1852–57
- Architect: Sylvanus (Sylvannus) Grow
- Architectural style: Greek Revival
- NRHP reference No.: 98001353
- Added to NRHP: November 27, 1998

The Fisher–Nash–Griggs House, also known as the Cottage Home, is a historic high-style Greek Revival house in the city of Ottawa, Illinois, United States. It was added to the U.S. National Register of Historic Places in 1998.

== History ==
The Fisher–Nash–Griggs House, named for its first three owners, was built c. 1852–57 on Ottawa Avenue in Ottawa, Illinois. Between its construction and 1916 the home underwent a number of additions and renovations, all styled in Classical or Greek Revival.

George Smith Fisher had the northern part of the house built in the mid-1850s. It is thought to have been designed by Sylvanius Grow, who also designed the nearby John Hossack House. At some point before 1857, the Fishers added a dining room on the south. The house was expanded again in the early 1860s, extending farther south and adding a western bedroom and a summer kitchen. John Fiske Nash purchased the house in the 1870s and added a bathroom and vault area on the west wing. In 1910, the added an eastern bathroom, then extended the front porch with Ionic order columns two years later. In 1915, they added the porte-cochere on the east. The next year, they extended the east side and added a second floor. These were the last significant changes to the architecture of the house.

== Architecture ==
The house is setback from Ottawa Avenue about 100 feet (30 m); the street itself is a boulevard and one of the widest in the city. Ottawa Avenue is divided by a grassy tree-dotted median which is crowned on its west end by a Classical Revival war memorial. The house, of brick construction, is an example of high-style Greek Revival architecture.

== Historic significance ==
The house is significant for its architecture as a good local example of high-style Greek Revival architecture with Classical Revival updates. The Fisher–Nash–Griggs House was added to the U.S. National Register of Historic Places on November 27, 1998.

== See also ==
- John Hossack House
