= Samuel and Sally Wilson House =

Historic house in Ohio, United States

- U.S. National Register of Historic Places
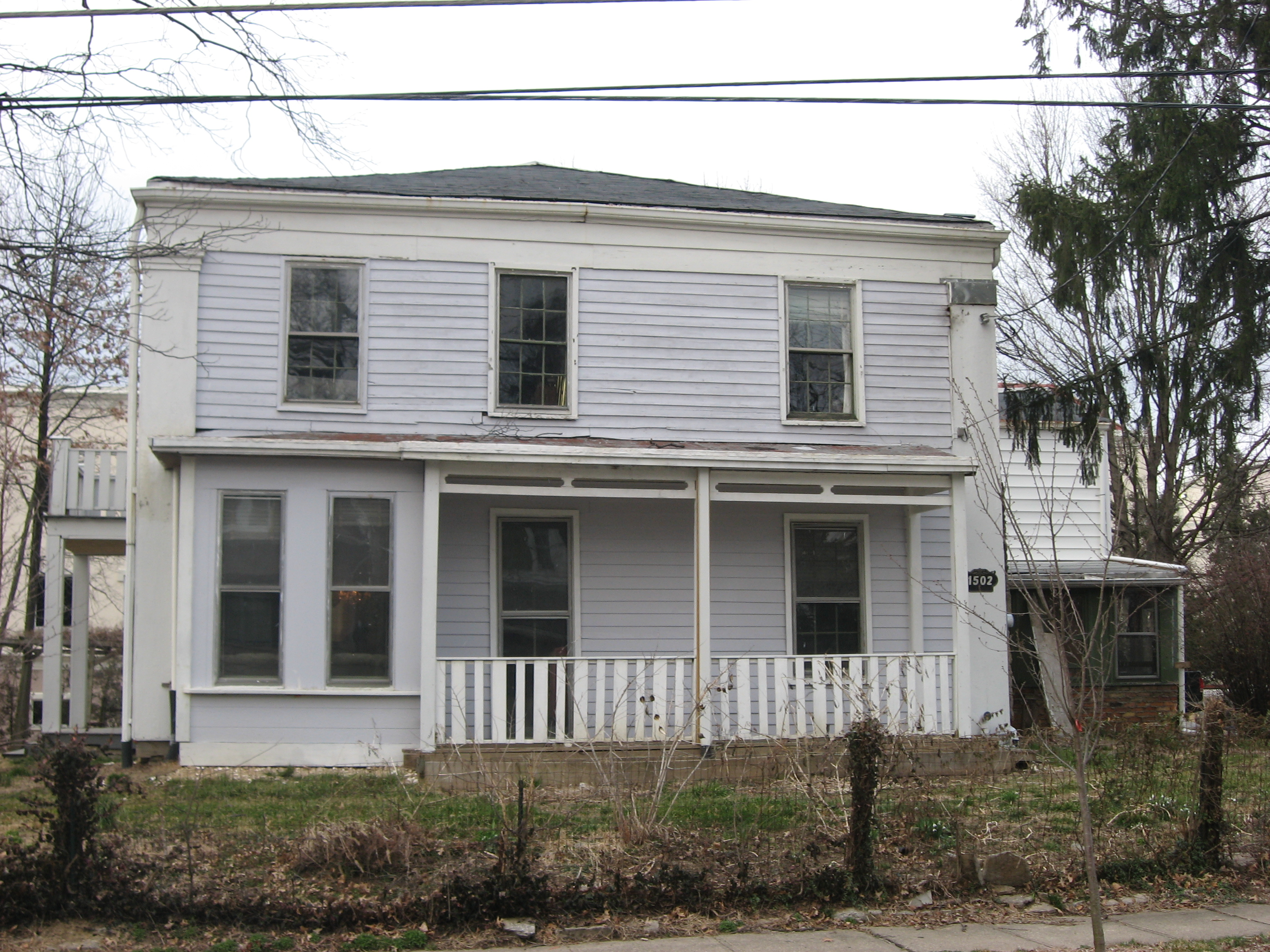

- Location within Ohio Location within the United States
- Location: 1502 Aster Place, Cincinnati, Ohio
- Coordinates: 39°11′30.76″N 84°32′40.50″W
- Architectural style: Greek Revival
- NRHP reference No.: 00001295
- Added to NRHP: November 15, 2000

Samuel and Sally Wilson House is a registered historic building in Cincinnati, Ohio, listed in the National Register on November 15, 2000. It was a stop on the Underground Railroad.

== Historic uses ==
- Single Dwelling

From the 1840s to the 1870s, well-to-do merchants and businessmen moved to the College Hill neighborhood of Cincinnati, making it a prestigious rural village characterized by large homes on spacious lots. The presence of two colleges in College Hill attracted abolitionist Presbyterian educators. These educational opportunities attracted Samuel and Sally Wilson, Presbyterians who had been criticized while living in Reading, Ohio, for their abolitionist view. Two of their seven children had previously attended the Cary Academy in College Hill and in 1848 their daughter Mary became a charter faculty member of the Ohio Female College there, which admitted women and employed female faculty.

The Wilsons built their Greek Revival home in College Hill in 1849, after which it became a station on the Underground Railroad until at least 1852. During these years, ten members of the family lived in the house, including four adult children, three grandchildren, and an aunt. In this house the Wilson family made important contributions to the history of the community through their leadership in American educational, religious, political and civic events. The abolitionist efforts of three of the adult children, Mary Jane Wilson Pyle, Harriet Nesmith Wilson, and Joseph Gardner Wilson, are documented in many sources. Mary, widowed in 1848, had been teaching at the College since then, while the youngest daughter Harriet taught in local public schools for 30 years, and lived at the Wilson house from 1849 until her death at age 95 in 1920. The youngest son Joseph was also a local professor, and lived at home until 1852. Joseph collected apparel from the families of this students and cooperated in obtaining disguises for runaways.

While the other four adults who lived in the house are not mentioned by name in existing documentation, they probably assisted fugitive slaves during the years that the house was used as a station. A local publication by the Cincinnati Historic Society states "All the Wilson children were active in the abolitionist movement and aided many Blacks to make their way north by supplying food, clothing, and a hiding place." In the early 20th century several groups of elderly African American men returned to the house and asked to see the cellar where they had once hidden and recognized the Wilsons' former housekeeper, Christine Gramm, still living at the house where she had first been employed in the 1850s. An extensive letter written by Harriet Wilson in 1892 describes her family's efforts helping slaves escape through College Hill. On one occasion when pursuers were headed to College Hill to search for runaway slaves, Harriet state "The women being 'entertained' by our family were terribly frightened declaring 'that they would die rather than be taken and carried back.' Though quite large in size they were ready and willing to crawl through a small aperture into a dark cellar where they would be safe." She states that her sister Mary "was for many years a teacher. . .and were living could give you vivid pictures of the workings of the Underground R.R., for but a few who traveled by it to College Hill, but who were encouraged by her words of cheer and aided by her helping hand." Harriet worked in Cincinnati and returned to College Hill on the weekends. Prior to her trip home on Friday evenings, she was given the number of slaves en route to College Hill so the "stations" were ready for their arrival. She recalls that "frequently, when at home on Saturday and asking for some article of clothing, I would receive the reply, 'Gone to Canada.'"

After the passage of the Fugitive Slave Act of 1850, Harriet recalled that "the work had become too well known. . . it was deemed wiser to have it carried on by other less exposed routes so in the years immediately preceding the civil war, there were comparatively none coming to the Hill yet those interested in the cause of human rights did their part financially to help in the work. . . ."

The Samuel and Sally Wilson House is located at 1502 Aster Place, in Cincinnati, Ohio. It is a private residence, and is not open to the public.

== See also ==
- List of Underground Railroad sites
