= Wilson Bruce Evans House =

Historic house in Ohio, United States

- U.S. National Register of Historic Places
- U.S. National Historic Landmark
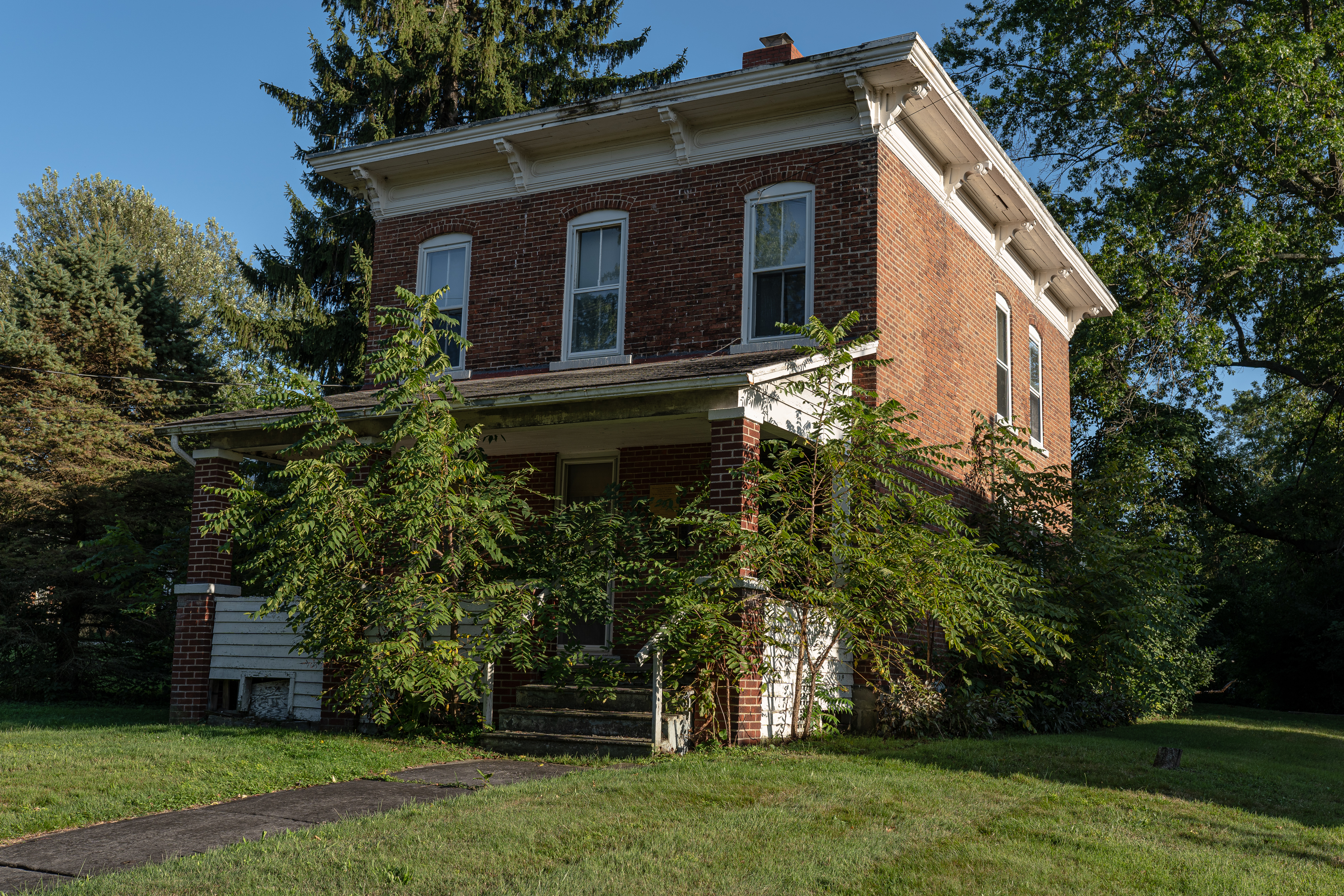

- Location within Ohio Location within the United States
- Location: 33 E. Vine St., Oberlin, Ohio
- Coordinates: 41°17′19″N 82°12′59″W
- Area: less than one acre
- Built: 1856
- Architectural style: Italianate
- NRHP reference No.: 80003143

Significant dates
- Added to NRHP: April 16, 1980
- Designated NHL: December 9, 1997

Wilson Bruce Evans House is a historic house at 33 East Vine Street in Oberlin, Ohio, United States. Completed in 1856, it served a major stop on the Underground Railroad, with its builders, Wilson Bruce Evans and Henry Evans, participating the 1858 Oberlin-Wellington Rescue, a celebrated rescue of a slave. It was declared a National Historic Landmark in 1997.

== Description ==
The Wilson Bruce Evans House is located south of downtown Oberlin, on the south side of East Vine Street opposite Martin Luther King Jr. Park, a small public park behind Oberlin City Hall. The house is a two-story brick structure, covered by a hip roof. The roof has extended eaves studded with decorative brackets. A single-story porch extends across the front, its shed roof supported by square brick piers. The interior is finished with high-quality woodwork, milled and shaped by Wilson Bruce Evans and Henry Evans. The house was built 1854-56 by the Evans brothers, two free African-Americans, and was occupied by Wilson Bruce Evans and his family. At the time of its landmark designation in 1997, it was still in the hands of their descendants.

== History ==
The Evans house was the home of Wilson Bruce Evans, a prominent African-American abolitionist and early benefactor of Oberlin College, the first college to admit students of color. Evans rose to national attention after his importance in the 1858 Oberlin-Wellington Rescue, one of the events that challenged the controversial Fugitive Slave Act of 1850. Although Evans was not an outspoken abolitionist like his colleagues Sojourner Truth and Frederick Douglass, Evans was cited as a man who "put justice above his own safety." The house was a frequent stop for travelers on the Underground Railroad such as Harriet Tubman.

== See also ==
- List of Underground Railroad sites
- List of National Historic Landmarks in Ohio
