= Grimes Homestead =

Historic house in New Jersey, United States

- U.S. National Register of Historic Places
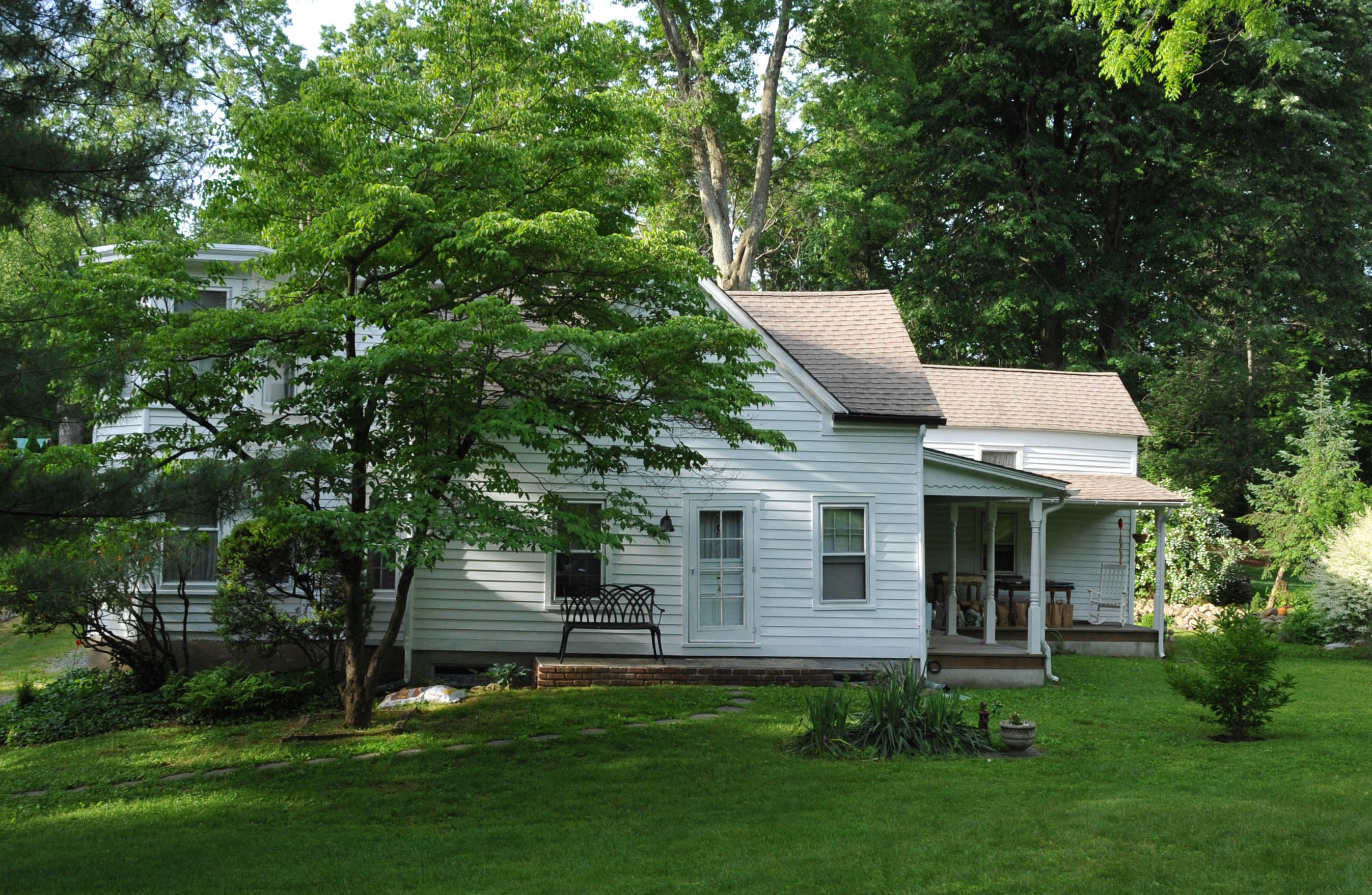

- Location within Morris County, New Jersey Location within New Jersey Location within the United States
- Location: 4 Craven Road, Mountain Lakes, New Jersey
- Coordinates: 40°52′41.6″N 74°26′03.1″W
- Area: 2 acres (0.81 ha)
- Built: 1979
- NRHP reference No.: 77000900
- Added to NRHP: April 1, 1977

The Grimes Homestead, also known as Grimes Farm, is a historic home in Mountain Lakes, Morris County, New Jersey, United States. It was constructed in the late 18th Century and served as a way station on the Underground Railroad for runaway slaves.

Anti-slavery advocate and Quaker, Dr. John Grimes (1802–1875), was born in this house and lived here until 1828. He moved back to the homestead in 1832, but subsequently moved to the neighboring community of Boonton. He was once arrested for hiding a runaway slave, and was repeatedly harassed by supporters of slavery. The house is now privately owned, and is not open to the public.

== See also ==
- List of Underground Railroad sites
- National Register of Historic Places listings in Morris County, New Jersey
