= Buckhout–Jones Building =

Historic commercial building in New York, United States

- U.S. National Register of Historic Places
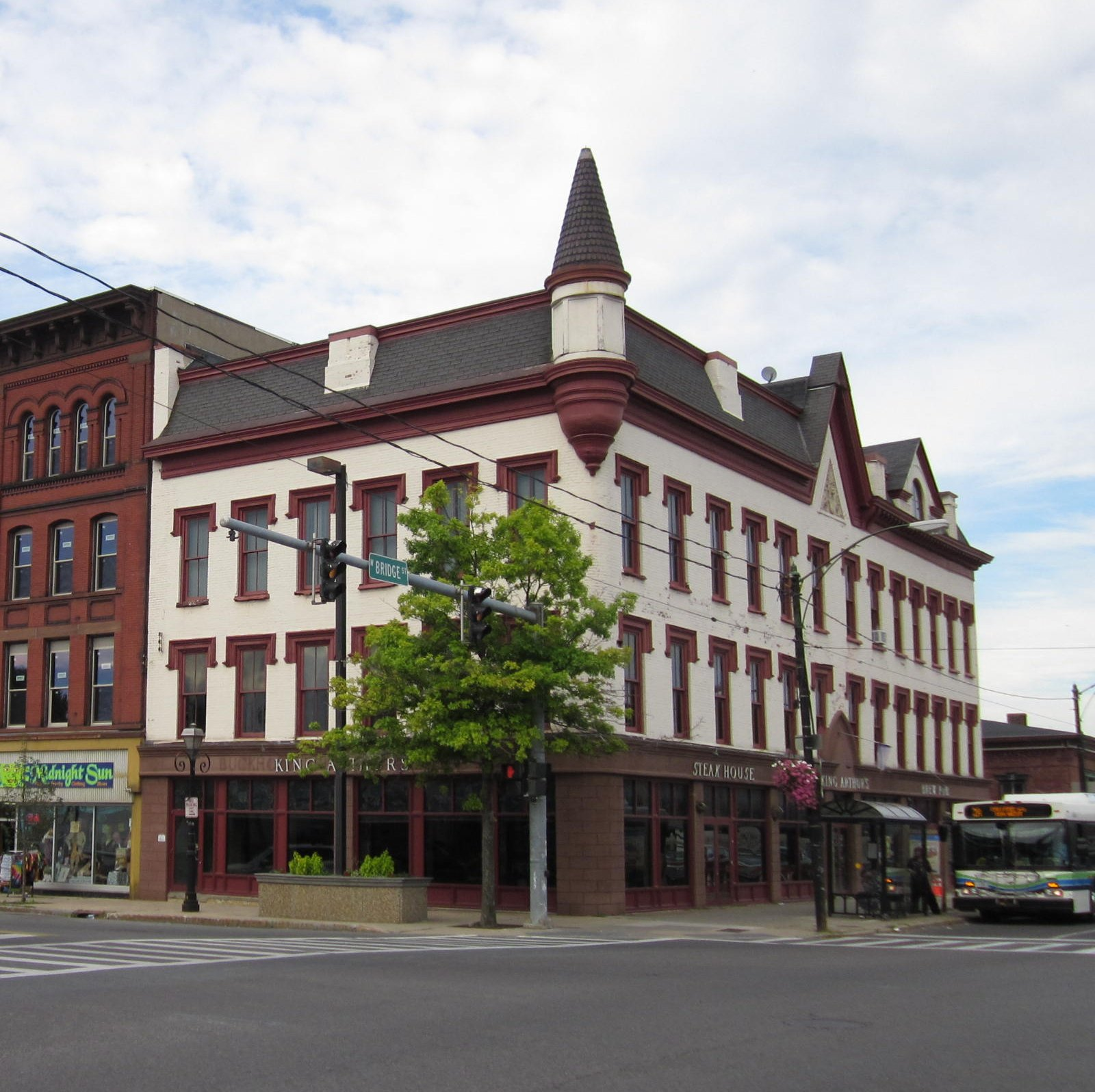
- Building in 2011

- Location within New York Location within the United States
- Location: 5-13 W. Bridge St., Oswego, New York
- Coordinates: 43°27′24″N 76°30′41″W
- Area: less than one acre
- Architectural style: Gothic, Queen Anne, et al.
- MPS: Freedom Trail, Abolitionism, and African American Life in Central New York MPS
- NRHP reference No.: 01001322
- Added to NRHP: December 4, 2001

The Buckhout–Jones Building is a historic commercial building located at 5-13 West Bridge Street in Oswego, Oswego County, New York.

== Description and history ==
It is a three-story brick building. It was built originally in the 1850s and rebuilt in 1876 after a fire. The building exhibits Gothic and Queen Anne design details. Two fugitive slaves operated barber shops in the building from the 1850s to 1880s.

It was listed on the National Register of Historic Places on December 4, 2001.

== Tudor E. Grant ==
Tudor E. Grant was a former slave whose barbershop business was in the building.
