= Lucinda Belknap Nye =

Lucinda Belknap Nye (c.1791–1888) was an abolitionist. Before the American Civil War in Zanesville, Ohio she was an advocate for the abolition of slavery and a leader in an antislavery society. Working alongside her husband, Horace Nye, Lucinda is believed to have provided assistance to escaped slaves. Lucinda taught at the Stone Academy as well, a known stop on the Underground Railroad. The Nye house is a historical landmark in Zanesville. Lucinda's contributions within the Underground Railroad were done secret for her safety and her family's safety, leaving minimal accounts of her contributions.

== Horace Nye ==
Horace Nye (1786–1859) worked alongside his second wife Lucinda in aiding in the abolitionist movement within Zanesville, Ohio. Horace was involved in the abolition movement through his church in Putnam and was a target of pro slavery mobs within Zanesville. In 1839 Horace was a target of a riot between Zanesville and Putnam to attack the conductors of the Underground Railroad. Within the Underground Railroad it is still unclear as to what Horace's role was although some records suggest he was a conductor. This is because all of his believed involvement in the Underground Railroad was done in secret for his safety. Mary Frances Nye-Potts who was Horace and Lucinda daughter went as far as to say "he always helped the black man to a safe retreat whenever an opportunity offered."

== Early life and context ==
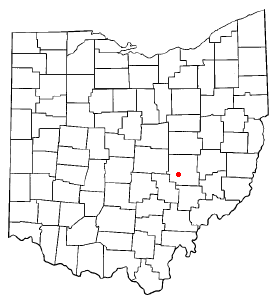
Zanesville, Ohio

=== Lucinda's early life ===
Lucinda Belknap was born in Newburgh, New York, in 1791 or 1792. Sources conflict on Lucindas birth year. Newburgh is situated along the Hudson River, where new ideas and perspectives were frequently exchanged. Other known abolitionists came from this area as well, like Sojourner Truth. Lucinda Belknap was exposed to ideas about abolition at an early age just by living in Newburgh, New York. She moved to Zanesville, Ohio, in 1819 with her family and teach in the Stone Academy before she got married. She married Horace Nye on October 8, 1830, in Muskingum county. This placed Lucinda in a deeply divided political area along a different river: the Muskingum.

=== Horace's early life ===
Horace Nye was born in Chesterfield, Massachusetts in Hampshire county. Horace Nye moved to Ohio in 1788 when Horace was only 2 years old. Horace later served in the war of 1812 and earn the rank of Major. After serving in the Ohio militia during the war Horace returned to Ohio and married his first wife, Fannie Safford. Horace and Fannie had five children with only one surviving infancy: Dr. Horace Safford. Fannie died September 7, 1829. Almost exactly thirteen months later on October 8 1830 Horace married Lucinda.

=== Context in Zanesville and Putnam ===
Zanesville and Putnam merged into one town after the Civil War in 1872. But before the merger the two towns were deeply divided specifically on the topic of slavery with Putnam being antislavery and Zanesville being proslavery. Today the area is known as Zanesville. The divide in the area was centered around the Muskingum River. One side of the river was predominantly made of settlers from New England who were against the institution of slavery. On the other side were mostly proslavery Virginians or "tuckahoes." This geographical divide combined with the idoelogical one only lead to higher tensions between the towns of Zanesville and Putnam.

The Nye House at 228 Adams Street was in a strategically valuable location as it was settled between the Muskingum River, Putnam Presbyterian Church, and Stone Academy. Their house was a hub of abolitionist activity.

== Battle of the Bridge ==
Horace and Lucinda were very public targets of the proslavery people of Zanesville. When the Ohio Anti-Slavery Society visited Putnam in May of 1939 the tensions between the two towns grew to a near breaking point. On the day that the society was holding a convention an angry mob arose in Zanesville and attempted to make their way to Putnam. When the people of Putnam heard of this mob they took up positions along the south end of the Third Street Bridge. A skirmish ensued where clubs, stones, and even Firearms were present. Shortly after the skirmish began the sheriff arrived he read the riot act aloud and started carrying people to jail. Acts of vandalism and arson occurred in the following days. Norris Schneider described Major Nye's contributions to the battle, saying that major Nye had been sleeping with his pitchfork next to his bed since receiving threats for his role in the abolition convention and that the aged and deaf Major carried a musket he brought home from the war of 1812 and was "eager to use it."

== Lucinda and Horace's roles within the Underground Railroad ==
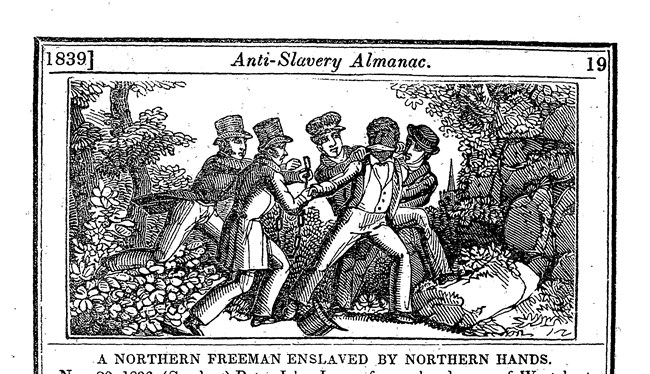
Fugitive slave being caught in northern states

While there is no explicit mention of Lucinda's role in the Underground Railroad in historical records Lucindas role as an abolitionist was extensive. Lucinda was the President of the Muskingum County Female Anti-Slavery Society, containing 51 members. It was believed that she was likely a conductor of the Underground Railroad as well. This belief comes from a letter written by Dr. Horace Safford Nye (the only child to survive Horaces first marriage) in a letter written to a local historian. In the end of the letter Horace Safford Nye cites his father as "among the bravest and most fearless conductors." The term conductor is usually defined within the underground railroad as someone who assisted in the moving of escaped slaves from one stop or safe house to another. Although there is no evidence that the two actually sheltered escaped slaves in their home being a conductor could be just as dangerous. As ever since the Fugitive slave act had been passed not only was it illegal to help these slaves, but northerners were also legally obligated to aid in the return of these slaves to their owners. Due to the nature of their operations and the inherent secrecy that came with many details are still unknown. Most of the movements of helping these escaped slaves were likely conducted at night in efforts to go unnoticed. This is especially relevant in their case because of the tensions in the area and opposing views in neighboring Zanesville.

== Legacy ==
While Lucinda and Horace Nye never received any major national recognition, their efforts are mentioned on plaques and known around Zanesville. The two are most remembered for their work within the Presbyterian church in Zanesville.Lucindas work as the president of the Muskingum County Female Anti-Slavery Society and Horaces role in contributing the churches messages against slavery and other antislavery connections. One of the items listed on the churches donations is "freedmen" which could be a hint to expenses related to the Underground Railroad. Their public positions and contributions to Putnam Presbyterian Church also carried potential personal risk due to the stiff opposition across the river. Putnam Presbyterian Church's first pastor was William Beecher, the brother of Harriet Beecher Stowe who famously wrote Uncle Toms Cabin. The church also hosted famous abolosionist Frederick Douglass twice in 1850 and 1852.

== The Nye House ==
The Nye House was built in 1830, the Nye family home is a five-bay brick structure. The house was a family residence and a hub of organized abolitionist activity. The two attended Ohio Anti-Slavery Society conventions held at Zanesville's Stone Academy, even presiding over the 1839 event. The Nye house is now recognized as part of the National Park Service's Network to Freedom. Although the Nye House isn't recognized as a stop on the underground railroad it helped to contribute to the efforts of the movement.

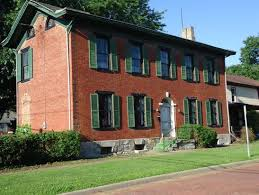
Nye House

The house is not believed to have provided sanctuary for escaped slaves traveling through central Ohio. As the Nyes' involvement was later confirmed by their children, it is still unclear as to whether or not the house played a more significant role in Underground Railroad activities. The historical significance of the property is formally recognized; it is listed on the National Register of Historic Places as part of Zanesville's Muskingum Historic District for the role its residents played in the abolitionist movement. The house remains a private residence today, but is seen as a symbol of the family's efforts to help escaped slaves achieve freedom.
