= Horace Anthony House =

Historic house in Iowa, United States

- U.S. National Register of Historic Places
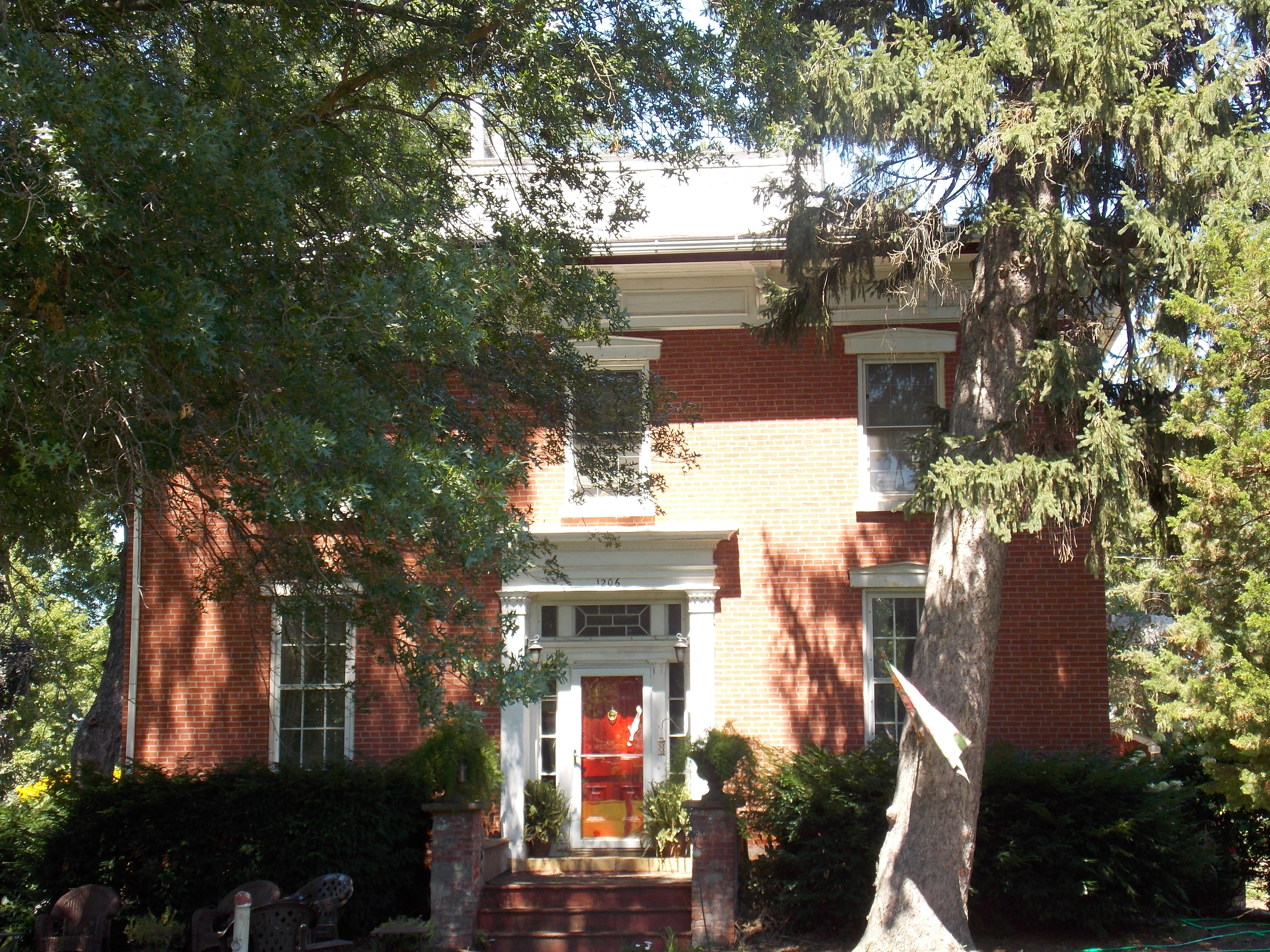

- Location within Iowa Location within the United States
- Location: 1206 Anthony Pl. Camanche, Iowa
- Coordinates: 41°46′52.05″N 90°15′31.28″W
- Area: Less than one acre
- Built: 1852
- Architectural style: Italianate
- NRHP reference No.: 91000533
- Added to NRHP: May 1, 1991

The Horace Anthony House is an historic residence located in Camanche, Iowa, United States. It was listed on the National Register of Historic Places in 1991.

== History ==
Horace Anthony was a prominent citizen in 19th-century Camanche. He was born in Livingston County, New York in 1816, and married Elizabeth McCloskey in 1840 in Davenport, Iowa. Together they raised nine children. Anthony owned the saw mill and the lumber yard in town, and was one of Camanche's wealthiest citizens. He was influential in the founding of Camanche Baptist Church in 1851. Anthony built this house the following year and it remained in the family for 107 years. He was an abolitionist and his house served as a stop in the Underground Railroad. Anthony was also a staunch Republican and served in the Iowa House of Representatives from 1858 to 1860. He served as the Camanche Recorder Treasurer from 1863 to 1865. He then served on the Camanche Board of Supervisors from 1867 to 1868 and was its chairman in 1868.

Anthony's son William joined him in the lumber business in 1859 when Horace became sick. The following year they had to rebuild the business after a tornado struck Camanche. The house was not damaged. A fire that caused $250,000 in 1893 destroyed most of the business and caused W.R. Anthony and Company to go out of business. Horace's son Frederick took over the title of the house when his father became ill. Elizabeth Anthony died in 1883 and Frederick died in 1888. Horace died on May 16, 1890. Frederick left the house to his wife Ella and their children Maude and Floyd. Floyd took possession of the house after his mother died in 1938. After his death his wife Agnes sold the house to LeRoy and Doris Goddard in 1958.

== Architecture ==
The Horace Anthony House is a 2½-story brick dwelling built on a limestone foundation. The brick was locally produced. The main block is a cube-shape that measures roughly 36 by 29 feet (11.0 by 8.8 m) and it has a full basement. There is a single-story wing on the back, and a porch on the east side and one on the west side. Both the main block and the back wing are capped with a hipped roof. The main block has a flat deck on top of the roof. It also exhibits wide overhanging eaves with a bracketed cornice from the Italianate style. The pedimented hoods located over the windows and doors, and the main entry with its classical detailing and side lights and transom are characteristic of the Greek Revival style. The ceilings on the first floor are 9.5 feet (2.9 m) high. The two windows in the front of the house go from ceiling to floor. In the center of the main block is a spiral staircase that rises from the main floor to the roof deck.

The house opens directly onto a city park rather than a street. The land for the park was donated to Camanche by Horace Anthony when he platted the land around 1852. The Anthony family mowed the grass in the park into the late 1940s. The city added the playground equipment in the 1970s.
