= Old Rock House (Alton, Illinois) =

Station on the Underground Railroad

- Location within Illinois
- 38°54′11.94″N 90°8′46.38″W
- Location: 2705 College Avenue, Alton, Illinois

History
- Built: 1834–1835

The Old Rock House was the home of Reverend Thaddeus Beman Hurlbut, who was the pastor of the Upper Alton Presbyterian Church (also known as the College Avenue Presbyterian Church) and a friend of Elijah Parish Lovejoy. It is located at 2705 College Avenue in Alton, Illinois. It was built in 1834–1835 by Henry Caswell and John Higham. It was a double-dwelling building, with John Higham on the east side. In 1927, the house was owned by Dr. Isaac Moore.

The first meeting to organize the Illinois Anti-Slavery Society was held on October 26, 1837. From meeting notes, the meeting started at the church, but due to "disorderly elements", the meeting ended. It was rescheduled for the following day at the Rock House, where the society was organized. This happened just before the pro-slavery riots in Alton on October 28.

It was a station on the Underground Railroad. Located along the Mississippi River, it was a refuge for freedom seekers from Missouri and Southern slave states. Abolitionists and free blacks helped former enslaved people make it from one station to the next location on the Underground Railroad. Tunnels underneath the Lewis and Clark Community College campus were used to help people gain their freedom. Lyman Trumbull of Alton wrote the Thirteenth Amendment to the United States Constitution which abolished slavery in America.

College Avenue Presbyterian Church and the Rock House are across College Avenue from each other. A historical marker for both buildings is located at College Avenue and Clawson Street.

== Sources ==
- Bowen, A. L.; Hurlbut, Mr.; Buchanan, J. M.; Quigley, W. C. (1927). "Anti-Slavery Convention Held in Alton, Illinois, October 26-28, 1837". Journal of the Illinois State Historical Society. 20 (3): 329–356. ISSN 0019-2287.
