= John Hossack House =

Historic house in Illinois, United States

- U.S. National Register of Historic Places
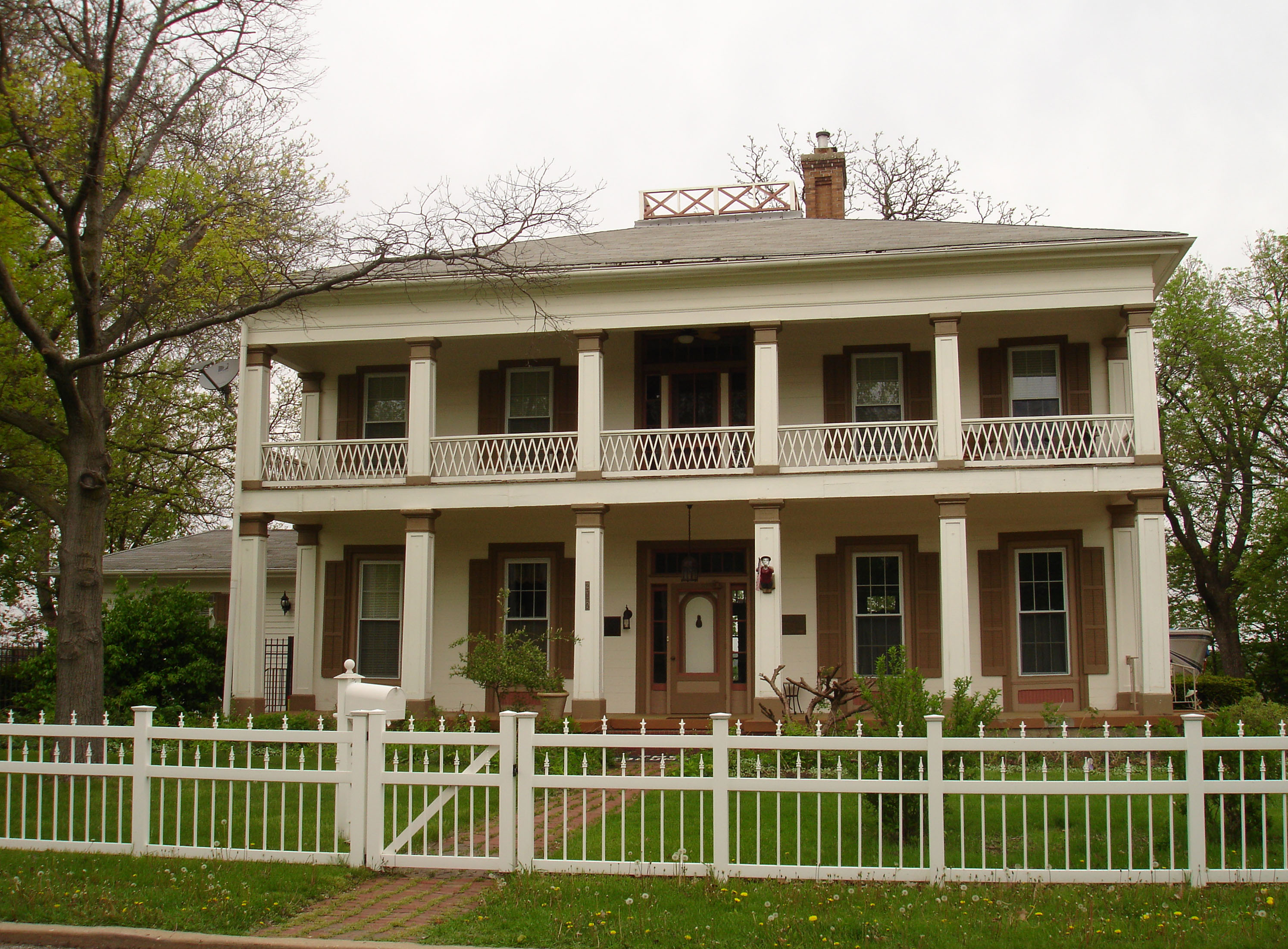

- Location within Illinois Location within the United States
- Interactive map showing the location of John Hossack House
- Location: 210 W. Prospect Ave., Ottawa, Illinois
- Coordinates: 41°20′24″N 88°50′28″W
- Area: 0.6 acres (0.24 ha)
- Built: 1854–55
- Architect: Sylvanus (Sylvannus) Grow
- Architectural style: Greek Revival
- NRHP reference No.: 72000462
- Added to NRHP: March 16, 1972

The John Hossack House is a historic house in Ottawa, Illinois, United States. It was built in 1854–55 and was a "station" on the Underground Railroad. It was added to the National Register of Historic Places in 1972.

== History ==
The John Hossack House was built in 1854–55 by John Hossack, a Scottish born Ottawan. Hossack had worked on the Illinois-Michigan Canal in Chicago before arriving in Ottawa. Hossack was an abolitionist who hid as many as 13 fugitive slaves in his house as a stop on the Underground Railroad. In a famous 1860 case involving fugitive slave Jim Gray, Hossack and other Ottawans were convicted in Federal Court in Chicago of violating the Fugitive Slave law.

== Architecture ==
The John Hossack House is considered one of Ottawa's most beautiful houses. It is sited on the banks of the Illinois River overlooking the city. The building was designed by Sylvanus Grow and constructed by Alonzo Edwards. The house is a good example of Greek Revival architecture. Its details and proportions draw a conscious connection to the Classical tradition.

== Historic significance ==
The house is significant for its role as part of the Underground Railroad as well as the commercial and political significance of its original owner. The John Hossack House was added to the U.S. National Register of Historic Places on March 16, 1972.

== See also ==
- List of Underground Railroad sites
- Fisher-Nash-Griggs House
