= Hossack River =

Coordinates: 42°24′S 173°04′E

Location
- Country: New Zealand

The Hossack River is a river on the South Island of New Zealand. It flows north from close to the Hossack Saddle, 17 kilometres (11 mi), northwest of Hanmer Springs, before joining the Acheron River.

== See also ==
- List of rivers of New Zealand
