= John Hossack =

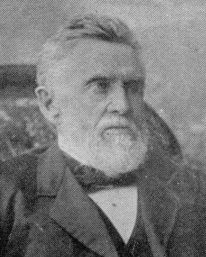
- John Hossack
- Born: December 6, 1806; Elgin, Moray, Scotland
- Died: December 8, 1891 (aged 85); Ottawa, Illinois, United States
- Occupations: Grain and lumber trader, abolitionist
- Known for: Involvement in the Underground Railroad
- Movement: Slavery abolition
- Criminal charge: Violating the Fugitive Slave Law of 1850
- Criminal penalty: Ten days imprisonment, $100 fine
- Spouse: Martha Lens (1833–?)
- Children: 11

John Hossack (December 6, 1806 — November 8, 1891) was a Scottish-American abolitionist whose home, John Hossack House, was a "station" on the Underground Railroad. He gained notoriety in 1860 when he was tried and convicted for violating the Fugitive Slave Law of 1850 by helping Jim Gray, an African American, avoid slave catchers.

== Background, 1806-1838 ==
Born in Elgin, Scotland in 1806, Hossack immigrated to North America at the age of twelve when he traveled to Quebec to work in an uncle's confectionery store. Upon becoming an adult, he set up his own confectionery store. He married Martha Lens in 1833; the couple would eventually have eleven children together. Soon after his marriage, Hossack left the confectionery business to become a contractor on the Long Sault canal being built on the Saint Lawrence River.

== Early involvement with abolitionism, 1838-1859 ==
In 1838, Hossack moved to Chicago to become a contractor on the Illinois and Michigan Canal. When funding for the canal dried up however, Hossack, having all of his capital tied up in the canal, was forced to seek other work, and opened up a prairie farm, known as "Hossack's Grove", in Cook County. It was during this time that Hossack first became involved in the abolitionist cause, and Hossack's Grove became a refuge for runaway slaves.

In 1849, Hossack moved to Ottawa, Illinois to engage in the lumber trade. He soon became involved in the business of buying and shipping grain to Chicago. Within a few years, Hossack was one of the largest dealers in lumber and grain in the Midwestern United States.

As a prominent Ottawa citizen, Hossack played a large role in having a bridge erected over the Illinois River. In 1854, Hossack built John Hossack House on the banks of the Illinois River. During this period, Hossack deepened his connection with the Underground Railroad, and as many as thirteen fugitive slaves were quartered at John Hossack House at any one time. Hossack was outspoken in his denunciation of the Fugitive Slave Law of 1850, calling it infamous and contrary to the laws of God. During this time, Hossack became a friend and associate of William Lloyd Garrison, Owen Lovejoy, Gerrit Smith, John Wentworth, and other abolitionists.

John Hossack was among the dignitaries on the platform for the first of the Lincoln-Douglas debates of 1858, which took place in Ottawa in August 1858.

== The Jim Gray Case, 1859-1860 ==
In 1859, three slaves owned by Richard Phillips fled from Phillips' plantation in New Madrid County, Missouri. One of those slaves, Jim Gray, was captured by slave catchers in Union County, Illinois on September 4, 1859, and imprisoned in accordance with a state law about runaway slaves. The slave catchers were noticed by abolitionist Benajah G. Roots, who demanded that Gray be taken before the county judge in Jonesboro, Illinois. The county judge denied the slave catchers' request that they be allowed to return Gray to Missouri, but he also refused to release Gray, because he did not possess "freedom papers". Roots therefore filed a habeas petition with John D. Caton, Chief Justice of the Supreme Court of Illinois, who was stationed in Ottawa, Illinois. Chief Justice Caton agreed that the state law by which Gray was being held was unconstitutional, but nevertheless ordered the Jonesboro sheriff to turn Gray over to the U.S. Commissioner in Springfield, Illinois so that the federal government could determine how to proceed under the Fugitive Slave Law of 1850. A number of abolitionists, including Hossack, attended the court that day, and, upon hearing Chief Justice Caton's decision, they yelled at Gray to run, Hossack saying "If you want your liberty, come." Other abolitionists then blocked the way of law enforcement officials as Hossack ushered Gray into a waiting carriage. Gray escaped to Chicago, and, eventually, to Canada and freedom.

"Speech of John Hossack" (1859)
00:22:25 (text)

Hossack was subsequently indicted for violation the Fugitive Slave Law, and tried in Chicago before Judge Thomas Drummond of the United States District Court for the Northern District of Illinois. The jury convicted Hossack, but recommended mercy, and Judge Drummond sentenced Hossack to only ten days in the Cook County jail and fined him $100.

Hossack addressed the court prior to his sentencing, in a speech subsequently published by the American Anti-Slavery Society. Hossack began "I am found guilty of a violation of the Fugitive Slave law, and it may appear strange to your honor that I have no sense of guilt" and then concluded

the jury have found me guilty; yes, guilty of carrying out the still greater principles of the Declaration of Independence; yes, guilty of carrying out the still greater principles of the Son of God. Great God! Can these things be? Can it be possible? What country is this? Can it be that I live in a land boasting of freedom, of morality, of Christianity? How long, O, how long shall the people bow down and worship this great image set up in this nation? Yes, the jury say guilty, but recommend me to the mercy of the Court. Mercy, sir, is kindness to the guilty. I am guilty of no crime. I therefore ask for no mercy; I ask for justice. Mercy is what I ask of my God. Justice in the courts of my adopted country is all I ask. It is the inhuman and infamous law that is wrong, not me.

During his ten days in prison, Hossack was taken out and banqueted by John Wentworth, mayor of Chicago, and greatly acclaimed by the people.

== Later years, 1860-1891 ==
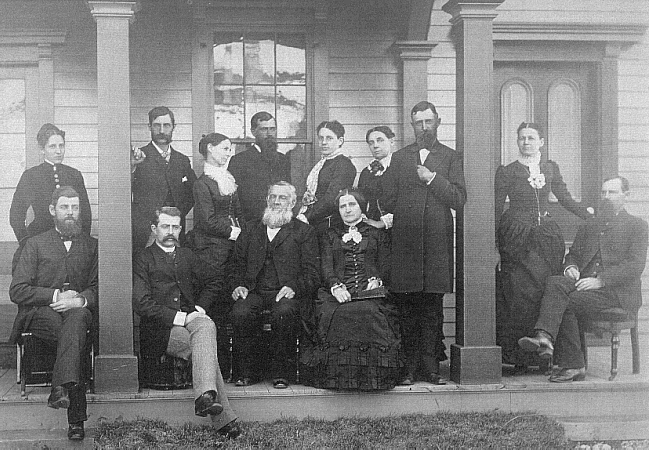
John and Martha Hossack, together with their eleven children.

During the American Civil War, Hossack was active in the Soldiers' Aid Societies.

In 1873, Hossack became totally blind and therefore retired from his lumber and grain business. He died in Ottawa in 1891.
