= Baylies Bassett =

Underground Railroad agent from the state of New York

- Born: c. 1821; Watson, New York, USA
- Died: April 2, 1902 (aged 80–81); Alfred, New York, USA
- Occupation: Farmer
- Years active: 1863 - 1902
- Known for: Running a station of the Underground Railroad in his house
- Spouse: Esther Eliza Crandall (1831 - 1891)
- Children: 6

Baylies Bassett also erroneously spelled Bayless Bassett (c. 1821–1902) was a farmer who ran a station on the Underground Railroad at his home at 29 North Main Street in Alfred, New York. The attic had a concealed space below the eaves where freedom seekers would hide and they "felt very protected and safe".

== Personal life ==
Baylies S. Bassett was from Watson in Lewis County, New York. His family came to Alfred in 1826. John C. Bassett was born in 1795 in Vermont in Brattleboro or Windsor. He married Martha St. John of Delaware, New York in 1818. They moved to the east side of Independence, New York about 1826 or in 1827. They had 14 children, two of whom died during their childhood. An early settler, he was a cloth dyer, traveling on horseback to Almond during the work week. The family lived on a 150-acre (61 ha) farm. He lived in Independence until 1859, when he died.

Baylies Bassett attended Alfred University in 1840–1841. In 1849, he married Esther Eliza Crandall (1831–1891).

At age 43, in June 1863, Bassett registered for the draft during the American Civil War. He lived in the 27th Congressional District. In 1865, Bassett was a farmer and he and Esther lived in Independence, New York with their six children: Willie C., Frank M., Fred S., Bryon S., Lottie M., and George C. from ages thirteen to a newborn. They also had a son, Baylies Sheffield Bassett, who was born in Canisteo, New York and married A. Belle Santee in 1909.

== Underground Railroad ==
The Bassett's house was one of several residences in Allegany County, New York that served as Underground Railroad stations. Others include Henry Crandall Home in Almond, the William Sortore Farm in Belmont, and William Knight in Scio. Within Alfred, Reverend Darwin Eldridge Maxson was also an Underground Railroad agent.

Freedom seekers walked through northern Pennsylvania, along a ridge of hills into New York, along what is now Interstate 99. They then headed west along what is now Route 417, ultimately bound for Dunkirk (on Lake Erie). Many church members became actively involved in the Underground Railroad after the Fugitive Slave Act of 1850.

The Bassett House was acquired by the Union University Church for offices and classrooms.

== Death ==
Bassett died in Alfred, New York on April 2, 1902.
