= Market House (Oswego, New York) =

Historic commercial building in New York, United States

- U.S. National Register of Historic Places
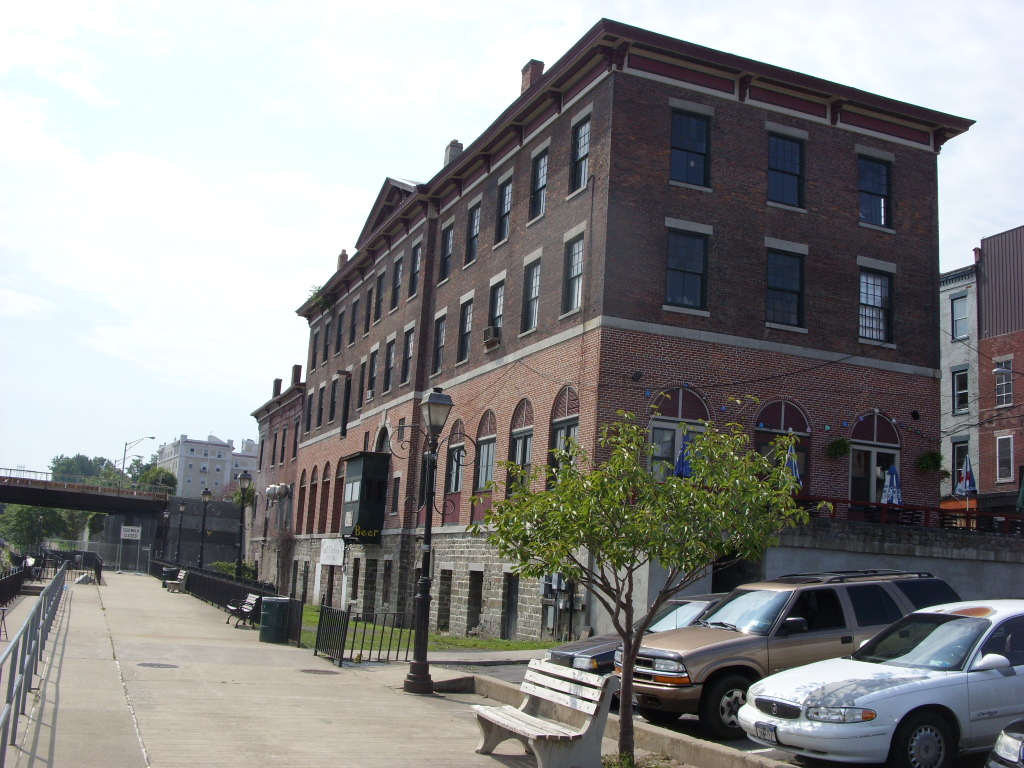
- North-Western Corner of Market House, Oswego NY, November 2008.

- Location within New York Location within the United States
- Interactive map showing the Oswego Market House
- Location: 159 Water St., Oswego, New York
- Coordinates: 43°27′26″N 76°30′39″W
- Area: less than one acre
- Built: 1835
- Architect: Bone steel, Jacob
- Architectural style: Federal
- NRHP reference No.: 74001292
- Added to NRHP: June 20, 1974

Market House, also known as The Market Hall and The D.L.& W. Hall, is a historic market building located at Oswego in Oswego County, New York. It was built in 1835 and is a massive brick and stone structure overlooking the Oswego River. The structure originally housed several government entities including city hall. A new city hall was constructed in 1870 and completed in 1872. A section of the basement is believed to have been used as a jail. In 1864 the city sold it to the Oswego and Syracuse Railroad, that used it for the next 80 years as office and storage space. The railroad upgraded the building with a bracketed cornice and elaborate cupola.

It was listed on the National Register of Historic Places in 1974. The structure is privately owned, and a bar located on the north-most section of the first floor, named "Old City Hall" has been there for many years.
