= Freedmen's schools =

Educational institutions after the abolition of slavery

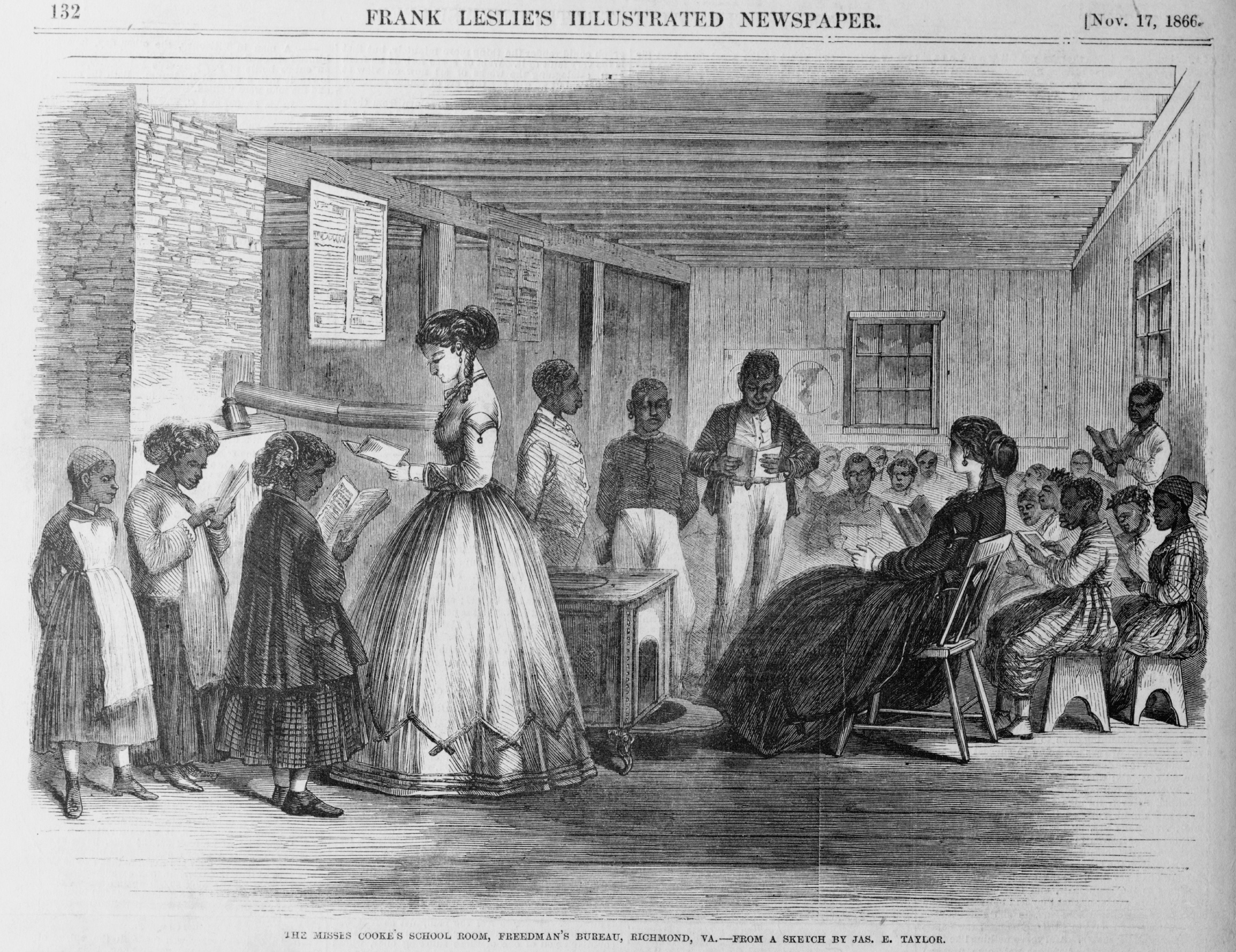
Image 1: A schoolroom with children of recently freed slaves and white teachers.

Freedmen's Schools were educational institutions created so on after the abolition of slavery in the United States to educate freedmen. Due to the remaining opposition to equality between blacks and whites, it was difficult for the formerly enslaved to receive a proper education, among a myriad of other things. Schools were made especially for blacks but were open to anyone regardless of race. These schools were far from perfect; however, they did give African Americans hope and opportunity for their future.

To free formerly enslaved people and other lower-class citizens from ignorance required education, a good one at that. The federal government created the Freedmen's Bureau, to help freedmen get on their feet, which after a few years of this establishment focused itself solely on education. And so the name for these schools became widely known as Freedmen Schools. Unlike other public schools, freedmen schools did not receive most of their funding from the government or taxes, so they had to find other means to stay afloat; African Americans relied primarily on donations, community taxes, and several churches to continue functioning given the low-to-nonexistent budget.

The belief that African Americans needed to learn how to be American and proper before they could be deemed as citizens, joined supporters to accomplish this vision. The establishment of these schools was years before the Jim Crow ‘separate but equal’ policies were established in law--at which point black and white segregated schools were literally regulated by the government; however, these schools were a predecessor.

== Origins ==
=== Church support ===
After the freedom of slaves in the United States, a few years before the federal government decided to aid the education of African Americans, many schools were created by the local churches and well-wishers from the North. In September 1861 the American Missionary Association (AMA) organized one of the first freedmen schools in Virginia and began their journey in this historic work. The AMA was primarily focused on two things: anti-slavery and missionary work. With this, many accused church denominations of indoctrinating the students, which later was deemed incontestable.

Despite fierce opposition, the American Missionary Association continued to lend its support to the education of freedmen and absorbed resources from similar disbanded groups. They also provided teachers funding and locations for schools. But like these other organizations, their support could not continue forever, and the AMA reluctantly pulled away most of their support efforts, leaving their members of the school board and teachers to continue giving what support they could provide. AMA's generosity towards freedmen helped and continues to provide education at the primary, secondary, and higher education levels. Schools would continue to be affected by the efforts of the AMA even as they entered into the era of 'separate but equal' after the termination of freedmen schools.

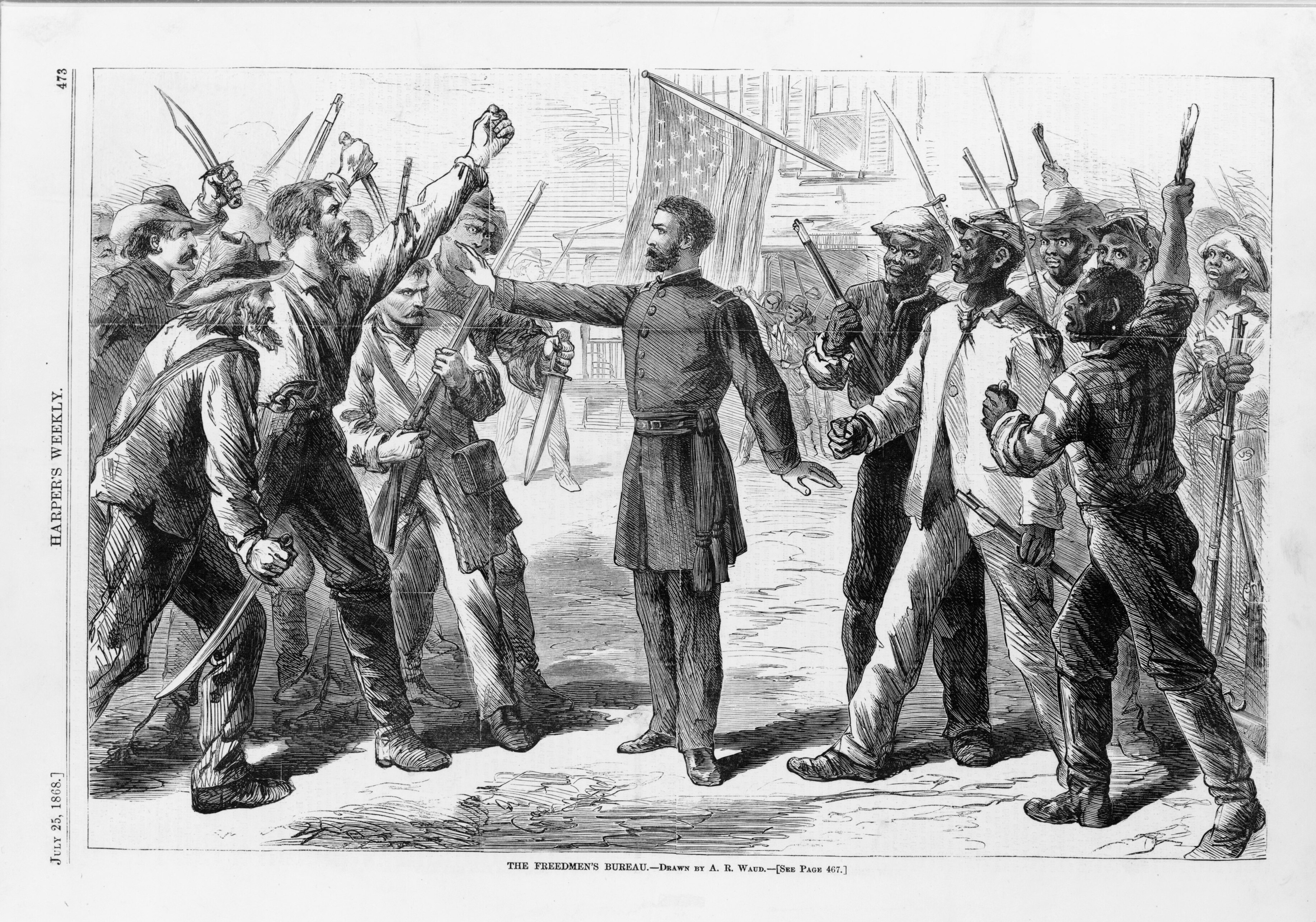
Image 2: The Freedmen's Bureau stands between a group of freedmen and white backlash

=== Freedmen's Bureau ===
Another organization that heavily affected freedmen's education was the Freedmen's Bureau. The Freedmen's Bureau was created by congress to aid African Americans in the South; which was a temporary form of government aid that was intended for the general welfare of the recently freed individuals and families - lasting only 6 years. After its establishment in 1865, the Freedmen Bureau Act of June 1866 provided concentrated support from the government to fund education, funneling the assistance of the Freedmen's Bureau primarily towards education. With this newfound goal, the Freedmen's Bureau steered education. Assistant commissioners of the Freedmen's Bureau appointed Superintendents and provided discounted rations to teachers to improve the system and encourage support. With their support, the Freedmen's schools continued to grow and flourish, but this was only temporary. In 1872 the Freedmen's Bureau disbanded. Because of relentless efforts in education, many states decided that segregation was no longer imperative and funded public schools in which all would learn together. Freedmen schools were no more after this, but what structure they left behind was used to inspire all Americans and added to the arsenal of education in America

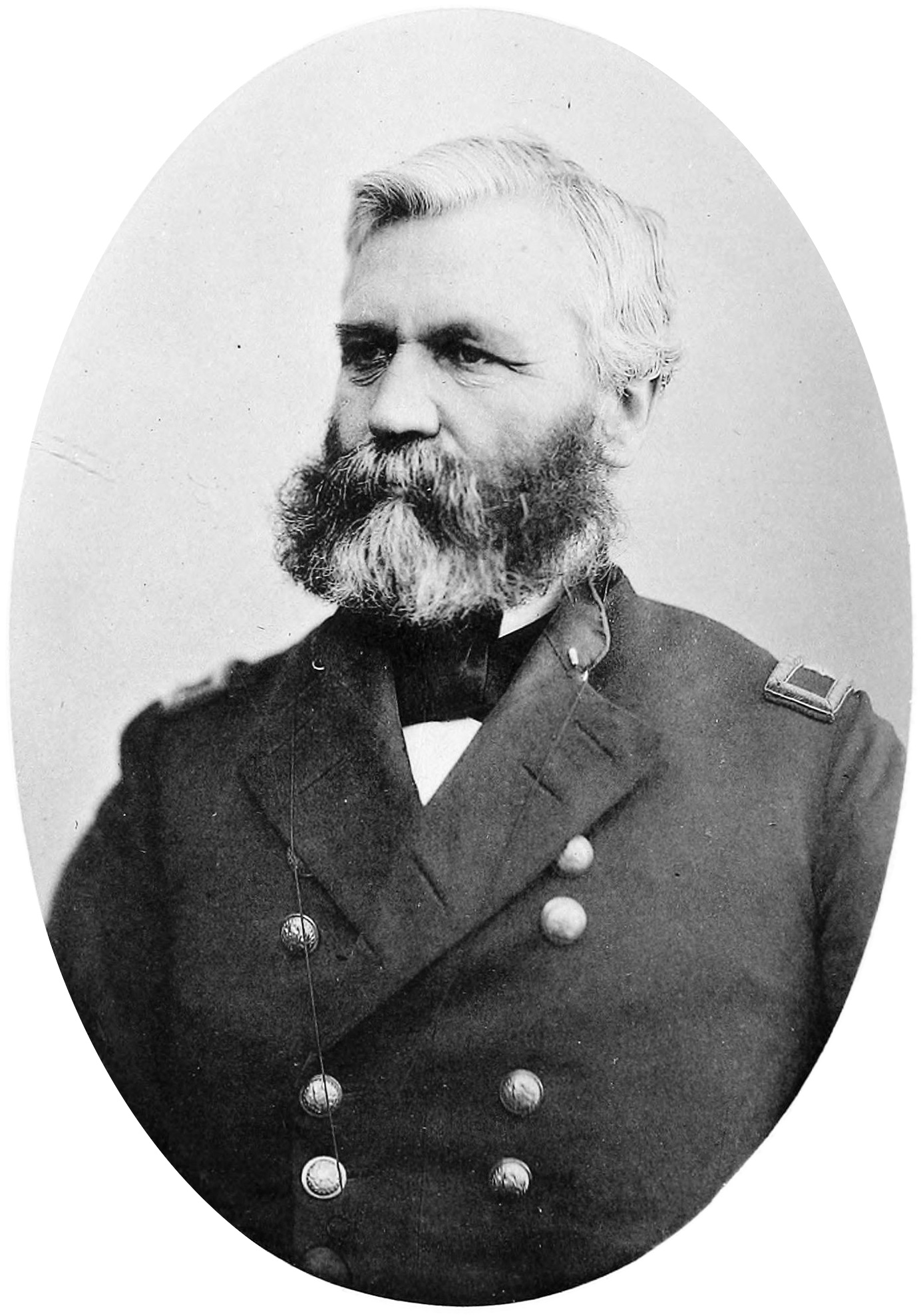
Image 3: General Oliver Otis Howard, Commissioner of the Freedmen's Bureau.

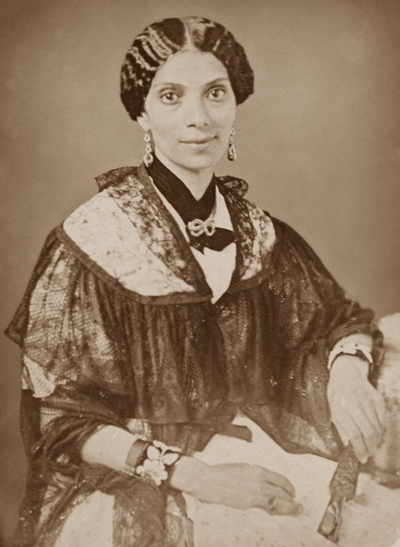
Image 4: Mrs. Mary Peake. African American school teacher.

=== People ===
- General Oliver Otis Howard: a general from the United States Civil War appointed as the commissioner of the Freedmen's Bureau. He was influential in the management and support of schools.
- Reverend Lewis C. Lockwood: Lockwood was a religious man hired by the AMA. He started one of the first schools for freedmen in Fortress Monroe, Virginia. Working jointly, he and Mrs. Mary Peake sought to enlighten students.
- Mrs. Mary Peake: The first teacher at Fortress Monroe hired by the AMA.
- John W Alvord: Alvord was the Superintendent of Education for the Freedmen's Bureau who took a tour of 740 schools in 1865 and reported facts and figures of what he found.
- Sallie Holley and Caroline Putnam: Holley and Putnam were two women who established a school in Virginia that later received the name 'the Holley School.' These two were influential in establishing and maintaining the Freedmen Schools in Virginia and worked with a group to provide donations for the support of the school, children, and community. Mrs. Holley would have her school children write letters to thank sponsors, especially to Ellen T Emerson and the Union Bible Society.
- Ellen T Emerson: Emerson was a member of the Union Bible Society. She worked closely with Mrs. Holley to provide the necessary donations for the 'Holley School' to continue in operation.
- George T. Ruby: a traveling agent for the Freedmen's bureau and influential advocate for expanding black education in the south, specifically in Louisiana.
- Edward L Pierce: General in South Carolina who oversaw schools for freedmen at Port Royal.
- Charlotte Forten Grimké: an African American teacher in South Carolina.
- W. E. B. DuBois: Graduate of Fisk University - historic freedmen college. He also taught at another college in Atlanta.
- Martin Luther King Junior: Graduated from Morehouse.

== Schools ==
Freedmen schools found mixed support from African Americans, although many were excited about opportunities to be educated, a large number of schools ran on a paid tuition basis and many emancipated people did not have the funds to provide schooling for themselves and their families. Schools operated on weekdays and occasionally offered night classes, providing secular education, and many also functioned as Sunday Schools.

=== Curriculum ===
Because education had been tailor-made for white Americans it was necessary that these new schools have a curriculum of their own. Aspects that these schools focused on were geared towards “Industrial training” such as frugality, stewardship, moderation, high aspiration, positive work habits, cleanliness, politics, honor, and the duties and privileges of freedom. In addition, these schools provided an advanced education in subjects such as Greek, Latin, reading, mathematics, and geography. The vision was to free African Americans rather than to replace their shackles with new ones. In other words, to unroot segregation and help this population of America learn how to think for themselves and participate in the community. And to nurture a growing sense of freedom and sustainability, Freedmen Schools sought to not only educate the African American population but also provide employment to them. Many graduates went on to become teachers, lawyers, doctors, ministers, etc.

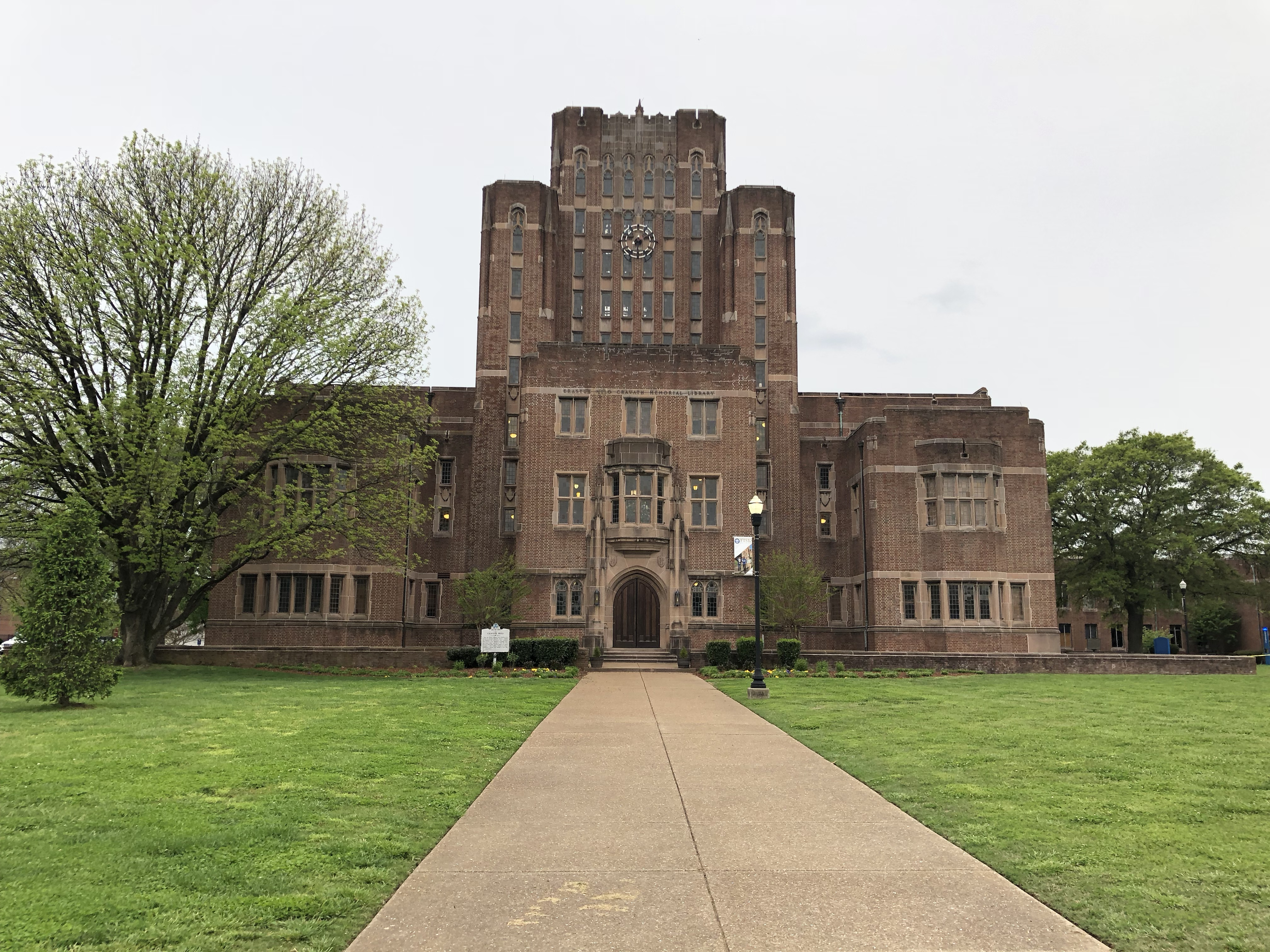
Image 5: Cravath Hall - Fisk University

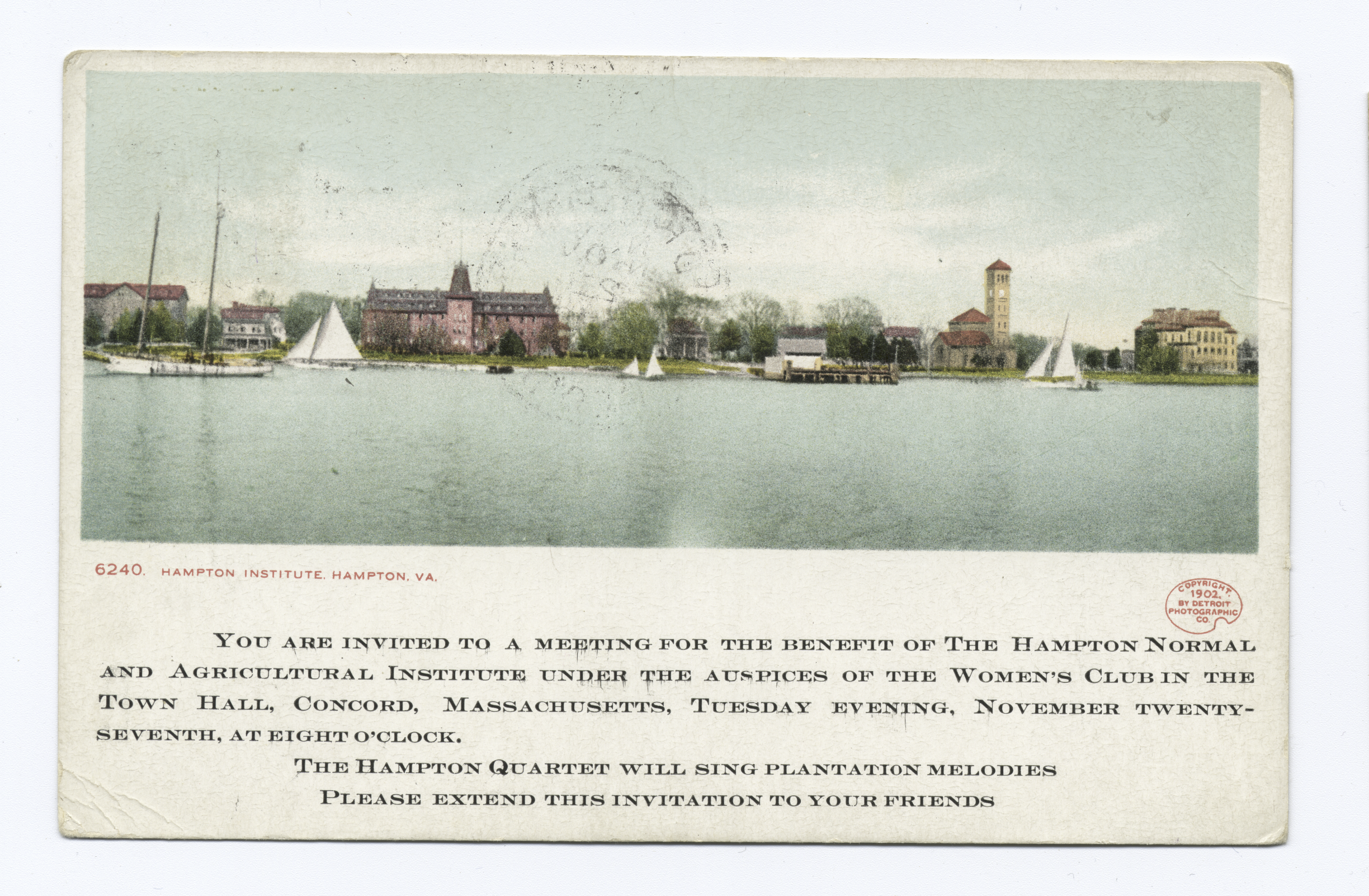
Image 6: Postcard of Hampton University

=== Schools ===
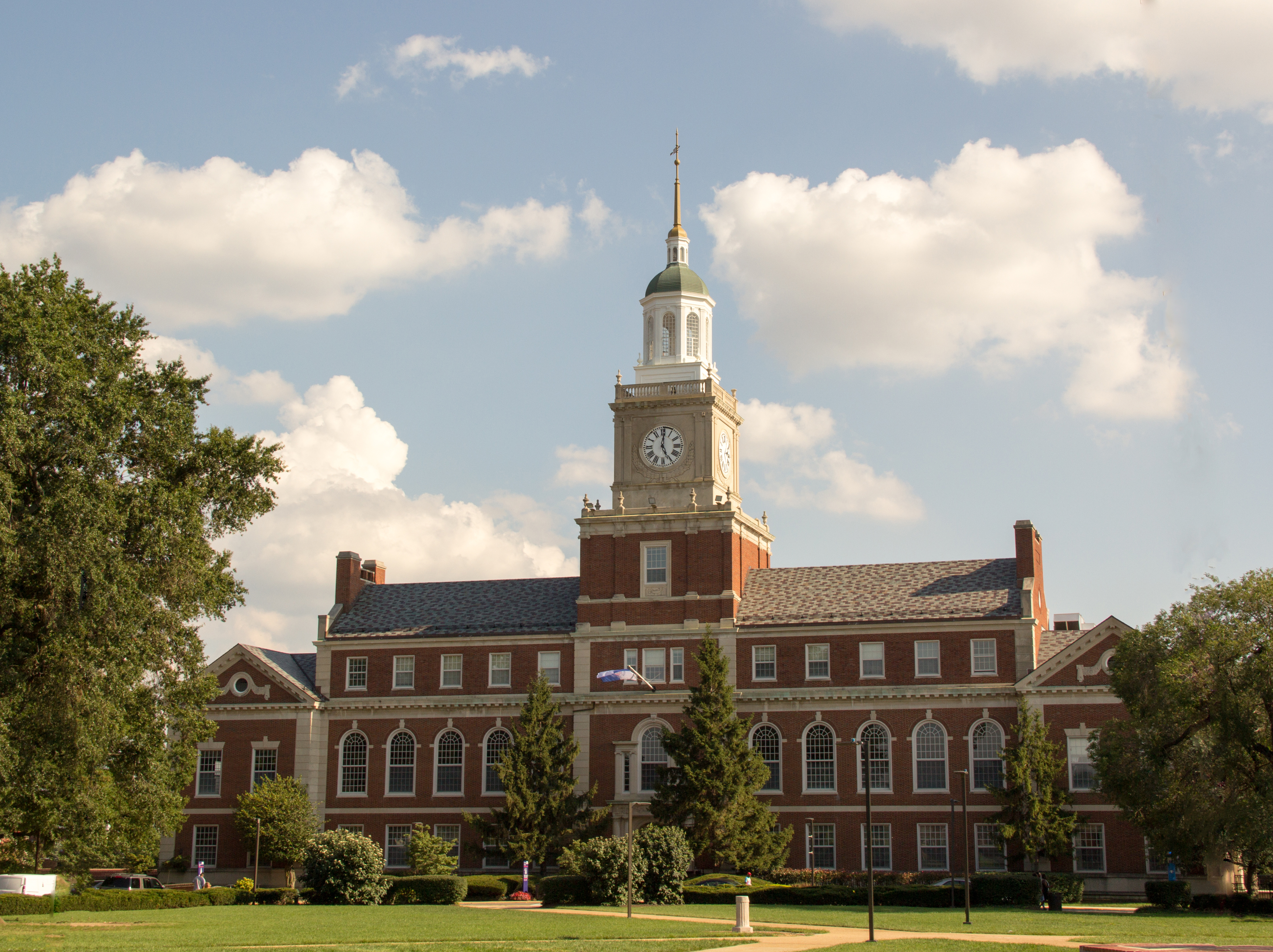
Image 7: Howard Universities National Historic Landmark Library.

Schools ranged from night schools, day Schools, and sabbath schools all the way to schools for higher education.

==== High schools ====
- Wilmington, N. Carolina.
- Beaufort, N. Carolina.
- Chapel Hill, N. Carolina
- Savannah, Georgia.
- Memphis, Tennessee.
- Chattanooga, Tennessee.
- Louisville, Kentucky.

==== Colleges ====
- Fortress Monroe.
- Port Royal, South Carolina.
- Fisk University, Nashville Tennessee.
- Talladega College, AL.
- Mobile, Alabama
- Hampton Normal and Agricultural Institute, Virginia
- Straight University, Louisiana
- Berea College, Kentucky
- Howard University, Washington D.C.
- Wilberforce, Ohio
- Morehouse College, Atlanta
- Spelman College, Atlanta
- Atlanta University
- Charleston, South Carolina
- Macon Georgia

== Backlash ==
From before to after their emancipation, African Americans and other similar races felt the hand of repression which continued for years, they especially felt it regarding education. Even poor white Americans had a serious lack of education and many were illiterate due to social inequality. There was much white pushback against education for freedmen in the south, fearing that it would make it difficult to keep the blacks “in their place” and interfere with their work habits. Many whites in the south also believed African Americans to be “uneducable”, reinforcing the backlash at Freedmen schools. Afro-Creoles found that despite their mostly white complexion, the attitude of the day was against anything nonwhite. With Black Codes, underfunding, and a lack of quality teachers it was a fierce battle for those first schools to begin. Thanks to the help of the Freedmen's Bureau and the AMA they were able to function. But contentions were frequent and the Freedmen's Bureau functioned as part of the War Department of the United States and would often stand peacefully between Blacks and Whites when these contentions arose (See image 2). Many teachers at Freedmen schools got numerous death threats and harm for attempting to teach emancipated African Americans. They relied heavily on the Freedmen's bureau and federal troops for protection and when these forces pulled out of the south, many teachers left as well. The end of the era of Freedmen's Schools was marked by the 1875 Separate but Equal sentiment. This had found popularity and would continue the oppression of African Americans until integration was put into effect.

== See also ==
- Black school
