= Sallie Holley =

American abolitionist and educator (1818–1893)

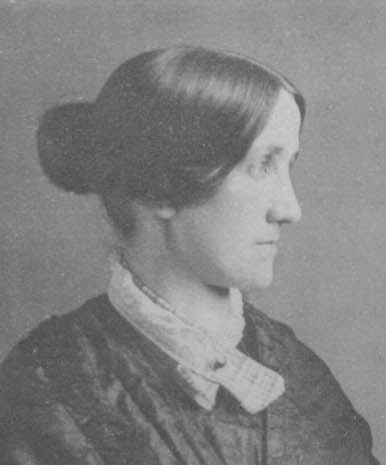
- Born: February 17, 1818; Canandaigua, New York
- Died: January 12, 1893 (aged 74); New York City, New York

Sarah Holley (February 17, 1818 – January 12, 1893) served as an educator to African Americans during the mid-1800s, becoming an avid member of the American Anti-Slavery Society. Specifically, Holley worked closely with Caroline Putnam to establish the Holley School, which still stands today.

== Early life ==
Born in Canandaigua, New York, Holley was interested in education and reading from a young age. In 1831, she attended boarding school in Lyons, NY, where she there attended her first anti-slavery lecture. Yet while this was Holley's first official lecture, it was far from her first exposure to the subject. Growing up, Holley was heavily influenced by the antislavery beliefs of her father, Myron Holley, who was also a strong advocate of religious liberalism. Primarily, he served as the original founder of the Liberty Party, which was the first political party to make anti-slavery a political issue.

== Education ==
Holley's inspiration for her later abolitionist work further strengthened when she continued her education at Oberlin College in 1847, where she encountered a biracial school community in an attempt to pursue a classical curriculum. At Oberlin, Holley also met Caroline Putnam, who quickly became Holley's lifelong companion and later work partner.

== Abolitionist ==
After graduating in 1851, Holley became an avid member of the American Anti-Slavery Society. This proved to be a rare feat at the time, for not only did women rarely advocate for their freedom or that of others, but they even more rarely did so publicly, like Holley.

Holley—along with Stephen Symonds Foster and Abby Kelley Foster, Sojourner Truth, Marius Robinson, and Jonathan Walker—reorganized the Michigan Anti-Slavery Society in 1853 in Adrian, Michigan. The state society was founded in 1836 in Ann Arbor, Michigan.

Holley traveled on a lecture circuit discussing the importance of abolition with Putnam by her side. Yet after this lecture circuit, Putnam decided to focus on teaching, specifically those now freedmen of Lottsburg, Virginia.

== Career ==
Even while teaching, Holley continued to motivate and influence others through her speeches and thoughts. Specifically, after an 1851 speech Holley gave at a church service about anti-slavery and the abolitionist movement, one person wrote,

Miss Holley gave us an earnest, powerful, and deeply interesting address. Everybody gave the best possible attention, and as she related several thrilling and affecting facts, the big tears coursed down many a cheek. It was a time of stirring sympathy and awakening interest in the cause of the oppressed and crushed slave. At the close she offered a very touching and simple prayer, all with the desire to put an end to what she coined as the "atrocious hatred of color."

== Legacy ==
After having followed Putnam to Lottsburg, Virginia, Holley purchased the land in 1869 for what soon became a more permanent location of the Holley Graded School. Modeled after Oberlin, the Holley School served as a private institution with both an integrated faculty and student body, where younger students attended classes during the day and older students attended classes at night. Putnam received ownership of the grounds of the Holley School when Holley died in 1893, who then passed the land to a black board of trustees upon her death in order to continue to promote black education. The Lottsburg school district then shortly oversaw the operations of the school. Because of a growing student body, renovations were made to the school in 1922 and finished in 1933, building the Holley School schoolhouse that now stands as a community center today.

== Bibliography ==
- Holley, Sallie (1899). Chadwick, John White (ed.). A Life for Liberty: Anti-slavery and Other Letters of Sallie Holley by Sallie Holley. New York: G.P. Putnam's Sons.
