= Caroline F. Putnam =

American abolitionist

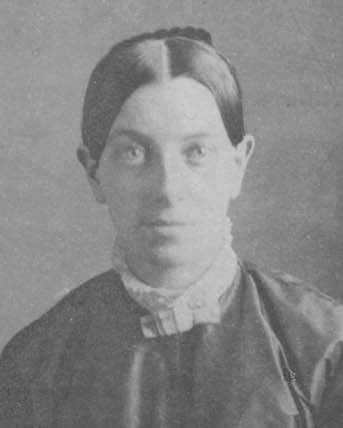
- Born: July 29, 1826; Massachusetts, U.S.
- Died: January 14, 1917 (aged 90); Lottsburg, Virginia
- Education: Oberlin College
- Occupations: Abolitionist, educator

Caroline F. Putnam (July 29, 1826 – January 14, 1917) was an American abolitionist and educator from Massachusetts, devoted herself in abolitionist movement and opened the Holley School for freed slaves.

Putnam graduated from Oberlin College after finishing four years of study and devoted herself in abolitionist movement. In the early 1860s, Putnam emphasized on aid for the freed slaves. Later, she moved to Lottsburg, Virginia, to open the Holley School for freed slaves. She devoted her life in educating and delivering ideas of freedom to black children from labor families.

== Early life ==
Putnam was born in 1826 in Massachusetts to a Unitarian physician, who died when she was a small child, and his wife Eliza (née Carpenter) Putnam. Of her father's first name, her middle name, or the town of her birth, nothing is known. Eliza Putnam's second marriage to Levi Peet moved the family to southwestern New York.

== Education ==
Putnam enrolled at Oberlin College in 1848, where she met Sallie Holley. Like Holley, who was to become her lifelong companion, Putnam was out of step with Oberlin on evangelical doctrine, eventually embracing Unitarianism. Also at odds with the college's conservative evangelical abolitionism, she followed Holley into the more radical Garrisonian wing of the abolitionist movement. Both women spent their lives in greater female activism and more radical social reform than were endorsed by Oberlin faculty.

When Holley graduated in 1851, Putnam left Oberlin without completing her studies. For the next decade she worked for the abolition of slavery, largely in the shadow of Holley, who became a noted abolitionist lecturer. Putnam traveled with Holley, wrote to newspapers about Holley's speaking engagements, and called door-to-door in villages across the North to explain the tenets of Garrisonianism, though she disliked the rootlessness of constant travel and felt that she lacked the tenacity and emotional resilience required by the work.

== Career ==
In the early 1860s, Putnam and her lifelong companion Holley shifted their attention from abolition to aid for the freed slaves. In 1868, Putnam stepped from Holley's shadow, establishing new careers for both of them. Putnam moved to Lottsburg, Virginia, to open a school for freed slaves. She taught, looked after administrative tasks, pioneered innovative means of gaining financial support, and earned southern white acceptance without yielding on racial issues. Holley taught alongside Putnam after 1870 but was never reconciled to the isolation of rural Virginia, so she spent months at a time traveling in the North.

Putnam was an innovative, attentive teacher who adapted well to the conditions of southern rural black life. She held classes year-round in order to accommodate the labor demands on black children of different ages; she did not impose strict punctuality on a community without clocks; she and her assistants integrated a wide variety of print sources, objects, and the surrounding fields into the classroom. She remained at her post for forty-five years, teaching the children and grandchildren of the freedmen she had taught when she first ventured into the South. Though she retired in 1903, she remained at the school until her death in Lottsburg, Virginia. Holley had died in 1893.

Putnam maintained her larger reform and abolition commitments throughout her decades in the South. She was a strident activist in the struggle to assure the freedmen access to the ballot box in the 1870s, and she served as their advocate and adviser throughout the rise of the Jim Crow laws. She was uncompromising in her demand for racial equality during a time when most Americans turned their backs on African Americans. Around 1896, she became the president of the Virginia State Woman Suffrage Association. After Putnam's retirement she encouraged the emergence of the NAACP and also worked for temperance, world peace, and the protection of animals.

== The Holley School ==
In November 1868, Putnam became more directly involved with the freedmen, moving to Lottsburg, Virginia, to establish a freedmen’s school. Though named for Sallie Holley, the school was Caroline Putnam’s. She devised the curriculum, made innovations in pedagogy and policy, raised funds from northern friends, and taught in the school year-around. Holley joined her in 1870, but taught only intermittently.

The Holley Graded School was notable for emphasizing a political curriculum and stressed the historical struggle for African-Americans and criticized industrial education unmercifully. As a prolific correspondent, Putnam never wrote for publication.

== Retired life ==
Putnam retired in 1903, after thirty-five years of schoolwork, but she remained in Lottsburg, superintending the school and assisting in the community until her death in 1917. Among the northern white women who assisted in establishing southern African-American education in the 1860s, only Laura M. Towne taught longer; none remained longer in the South. Putnam is interred in Lottsburg, near the school founded.

== See also ==
- List of suffragists and suffragettes
- List of Virginia suffragists
