= First Congregational Church (Waukesha, Wisconsin) =

Historic church in Wisconsin, United States

- U.S. National Register of Historic Places
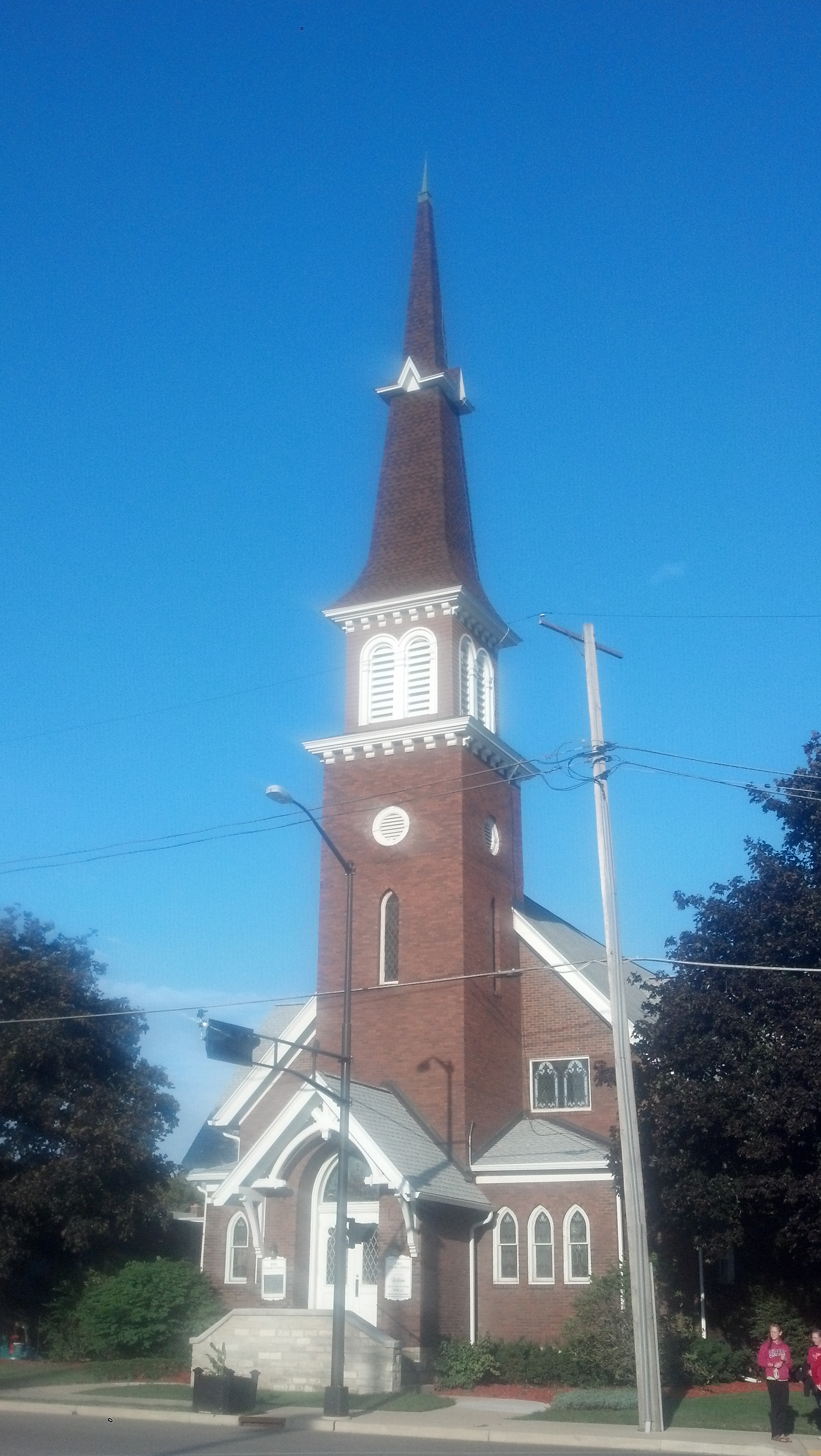

- Location within Wisconsin Location within the United States
- Location: 100 E. Broadway, Waukesha, Wisconsin
- Coordinates: 43°0′24″N 88°13′17″W
- Area: 1 acre (0.40 ha)
- Built: 1867
- Architect: Crane & Barkhausen
- Architectural style: Gothic, Tudor Revival
- NRHP reference No.: 91001991
- Added to NRHP: January 30, 1992

First Congregational Church is located in Waukesha, Wisconsin. The core of the current church was built in 1867 and has been expanded and remodeled since. The church is also used as a church school. On January 30, 1992, it was added to the National Register of Historic Places for its architectural significance.

When First Evangelical Congregational Church of Prairieville (as Waukesha was then called) was organized in 1838, it was the first Christian congregation organized in Waukesha County. The members met in homes and the log school house until 1840, when they built a small frame church on the southeast corner of Maple and Wisconsin Avenues. This building was the first Congregational Church building in Wisconsin Territory.

In the 1840s Waukesha became a center for antislavery sentiment, and some members of First Congregational were leaders, both in Waukesha and the Territory. In 1842 when Caroline Quarlls, who had escaped from slavery in St. Louis, found her way along the Underground Railroad to Waukesha, parishioner Lyman Goodnow drove her in a wagon under cover of night on her way to Ontario. In 1845, the congregation passed resolutions against slavery that received country-wide notice. In 1848 Ichabod Codding, who had edited the abolitionist newspaper American Freeman became pastor. A member of the congregation took his place as editor of the paper.

In 1867 the growing congregation decided to build a new, larger church. They sold their old church and built the new one at 100 E. Broadway. This 1867 building forms the core of the current building, but it was quite different from now. It was a frame building adapted from plan #2 in The Book of Plans of the Congregational Union. The floorplan was a simple rectangle and the style was Greek Revival, covered in clapboard. The 80-foot steeple rose above the front entrance, with the lantern and spire looking as they do today.

By 1899 they needed more space and the congregation decided to expand the 1867 building. They hired the Milwaukee architectural firm of Crane and Barkhausen and added an ell to each side to convert the floorplan from rectangular to cruciform. The additions increased space for seating in the nave, the Sunday school, a kitchen, and the pastor's study. They also restyled the building to the more current Gothic Revival style, replacing many flat-topped windows with pointed tops.

In 1922 the congregation decided the expand again. They covered much of the old clapboard exterior with brick, and added an 85 by 20 foot 1-story addition across the eastern end of the church. The addition is in a Tudor Revival style, with stucco and half-timbering. Inside, the addition made more space for Sunday school rooms and more space in the basement for dining and kitchen. In 1928, they added on again, adding a half-story above parts of the 1922 addition to add space for Sunday school rooms.

In 1961 the church added a modern-styled education wing.
