= Michigan Anti-Slavery Society =

American abolitionist organization

The Michigan Anti-Slavery Society, also called Michigan State Anti-Slavery Society, was founded on November 10, 1836, in Ann Arbor of the Michigan Territory (1805–1837). The first meeting was held at the First Presbyterian Church on East Huron Street. The founding of the anti-slavery society was part of a movement to abolish slavery in several states during the 1830s, as well as support within the territory for the Underground Railroad. (Note: Elizabeth Margaret Chandler and Laura Smith Haviland founded the Logan Female Anti-Slavery Society in 1832, which also led to an important link to the Underground Railroad in Lenawee County, Michigan.)

It was formed by 75 abolitionists from six counties. The organization was supported by Wesleyan Methodists and Quakers. There were anti-slavery and pro-slavery viewpoints in Michigan. Guy Beckley and Theodore Foster, publishers of the Signal of Liberty, wrote: "Our neighbors accuse us of being 'worse than horse thieves,' because we have given to the colored man a helping hand in his perilous journey... We are also held up as transgressors of the law and having no regard for the civil authority." (The Fugitive Slave Law of 1793 made it illegal to aid escapees.)

Society meetings were held at the First Presbyterian Church for ten years, although the Presbyterian Church of the United States did not want to take a political stance against slavery. Some of the members of the First Presbyterian Church broke away from the church and founded the First Congregational Church of Ann Arbor in 1847.

One of the adopted resolutions was to establish an anti-slavery newspaper in Michigan, which began with American Freeman, then the Michigan Freeman, which were replaced by the weekly Signal of Liberty in 1841. The society's executive committee contributed to the newspaper. A historic marker is located on the site of the First Presbyterian Church in recognition in its role in founding the anti-slavery society and the newspapers.

The society was reorganized at Adrian by Stephen Symonds Foster and Abby Kelley Foster, Sojourner Truth, Jonathan Walker, Marius Robinson, and Sallie Holley.
