= Come-outer =

Common phrase

Come-outer is a phrase coined in the 1830s which denotes a person who withdraws from an established organization or who advocates political reform. It originally referred to abolitionist Christians in America who left their churches due to opposing views on slavery.

== History ==
The term was first applied during the Second Great Awakening to a small group of American abolitionists who dissented from religious orthodoxy, who withdrew from a number of established churches because the churches were not progressive enough on the issue of abolition. A come-outer would not join a church which held a neutral position on the issue of slavery, and he would not vote, or run for office, or otherwise take part in a government that let slavery happen. The phrase was derived from the Bible verse 2 Corinthians 6:17, which reads, "Wherefore come out from among them, and be ye separate, saith the Lord, and touch not the unclean thing; and I will receive you." The phrase "come out from among them" is a reference to Isaiah 52:11.

=== Garrisonian anti-institutionalism ===
William Lloyd Garrison was an influential Boston abolitionist who founded the New England Anti-Slavery Society and the American Anti-Slavery Society in the early 1830s. Garrison advocated an immediate end to slavery, rather than a step-by-step process working through the political system. In 1832, he printed an anti-slavery tract called Thoughts on African Colonization which included the "come out from among them" verse from the Second Epistle to the Corinthians, and a quote from a recently deceased Reverend Doctor Thomson of Edinburgh: "To say that we will only come out of the sin by degrees—that we will only forsake it slowly, and step by step... is to trample on the demands of moral obligation..." At the New England Anti-Slavery Convention in 1836, Garrison proposed that only churches willing to help fight slavery should be considered "the true and real church of God." This was viewed by many as too divisive, so other means were tried until the 1837 convention when a resolution was adopted urging abolitionists to leave unresponsive churches, "to come out from among them and be separate." Garrison's radical ideas defined a strong split within the anti-slavery societies, and Garrison was abandoned by all but a dedicated core group of like-minded abolitionists. The Boston-based group of reformers began to be called "come-outers".

Garrison's newspaper, The Liberator, served to spread his view of abolition and anti-institutionalism. From time to time, news items about come-outers would appear, some culled from other journals. In 1851, Garrison quoted an article entitled "Come-outers in jail" which appeared in The Barnstable Patriot: "Several of these poor deluded beings in Barnstable, whose actions we have before noticed, are now on trial in that town for an assault upon a constable when in the discharge of his duty…the poor creatures are insane, and can hardly be held responsible for their acts. ….the most fitting place for these unfortunate beings is in the Insane Hospital." Garrison offered his opinion that the 'poor deluded beings' were quite properly "laboring under religious insanity."

Other regions of the United States that held pockets of "come-outerism" included Cape Cod, New Hampshire and New York.

=== Abolition and church reform ===
Come-outers themselves split further into those who, like Garrison, were against any institution at all, and those who believed that political systems and churches could be reformed into anti-slavery organizations. Non-Garrisonian come-outers split from Methodist, Baptist and Presbyterian churches to form new church doctrines that were either completely free of slavery or focused on anti-slavery. The American Baptist Anti-Slavery Convention in 1840 brought the issue to the fore, defining a split among Baptists. The American Baptist Free Mission Society formed in 1843 in Boston when 17 Baptists led by William Henry Brisbane left their church to create a non-racist, anti-slavery evangelical group with missions to Haiti, Burma and Africa. James G. Birney and Gerrit Smith were among those who left the Presbyterian church. The integrated American Missionary Association, a non-denominational group, formed in 1846 mostly of Presbyterian and Congregational members who were unable to get their churches to commit to fight slavery. The Wesleyan Methodist Connection was organized in 1843, largely by those coming out of the Methodist Episcopal Church; grew to some 15,000 members. The Free Methodist Church was similarly formed by former Methodist Episcopalians. By 1850, membership in come-outer churches, combined with those in religious denominations such as Free Will Baptist who had long been against slavery, reached 241,000 in America.

=== Tax resistance ===
Some come-outers engaged in tax resistance because of their unwillingness to fund a government that did not work to end slavery. Henry David Thoreau and Amos Bronson Alcott both used tax resistance in this way. Utopian Brook Farm has been described as "a come-outer enterprise".

== People ==
- Maria Weston Chapman
- Stephen Symonds Foster called the clergy "a brotherhood of thieves".
- Timothy Gilbert left his unresponsive Baptist church to join the Free Baptist Church in Boston.
- Abby Kelley left her Quaker church in 1841, "feeling it a duty to 'come out and be separate'.
- Wendell Phillips
- Parker Pillsbury
- Nathaniel P. Rogers, once introduced to it, held to the "come-outer" doctrine more strongly than Garrison.

== See also ==
- Free Soil Party
- Liberty Party (1840s)
- Locofocos
- Millerism
