= Stephen Symonds Foster =

American abolitionist (1809–1881)

Stephen Symonds Foster (November 17, 1809 – September 13, 1881) was a American abolitionist, temperance activist, and feminist known for his dramatic and aggressive style of public speaking, and for his stance against those in the church who failed to fight slavery. His marriage to Abby Kelley brought his energetic activism to bear on women's rights. He spoke out for temperance, and agitated against any government, including his own, that would condone slavery.

Foster helped establish the New Hampshire Anti-Slavery Society, and belonged to the 'New Hampshire radicals' group within the American Anti-Slavery Society. Foster wrote anti-slavery tracts and published in 1843 a widely discussed book that met with protest and critical response: The Brotherhood of Thieves; or A True Picture of the American Church and Clergy: A Letter to Nathaniel Barney, of Nantucket. At Liberty Farm where they lived, Foster and his wife formed a link on the Underground Railroad, and helped fugitive slaves reach Canada and freedom.

== Early life ==
Foster was born in Canterbury, New Hampshire, on November 17, 1809. His parents Sarah and Asa Foster had twelve children, Stephen was the ninth. The family attended the local Congregational church, and took part in Canterbury's anti-slavery society.

Foster apprenticed to a carpenter but left at age 22 to study to become a missionary. He went to Dartmouth College where his brother Asa had graduated and studied the classics, including Greek and Latin. Foster embraced abolitionism at this time, and in his third year invited Angelina Grimké to speak to the Young Men's Anti-Slavery Society. During his senior year, Foster was arrested and put in prison for not paying a debt of $12.14 (~$379.00 in 2025) to a local clockmaker; Foster was shocked to find that debtors were locked up with violent criminals and thieves, in common cells swarming with rats, lice, and fleas. From prison, Foster wrote a letter of protest which was published in a local paper. His friends raised bail after two weeks, but Foster's letter aroused indignation among citizens who later cleaned out the jail and then passed a law which banned imprisonment for debt. Foster redoubled his efforts in school, especially his rhetoric and public speaking courses, and graduated in 1838 third in his class.

Foster subsequently enrolled at Union Theological Seminary in New York City. There, he was forbidden by faculty to host an anti-slavery meeting he had scheduled. He was offered a scholarship if he would quit speaking of abolition, but Foster rejected this, saying he "could not be bought to hold his peace." In the spring of 1839, he left New York to take a position as traveling lecturer for the New Hampshire Anti-Slavery Society.

== Abolition ==
Foster was known to interrupt church services to denounce organized religion's complicity in slavery. In 1841, he was expelled from his Congregationalist church in Hanover, New Hampshire.

In Portland, Maine in 1842, Foster was wounded in a riot outside a meetinghouse. Pro-slavery supporters wished to prevent Foster and the radical abolitionist John Murray Spear from speaking. When the mob attacked, Foster took twenty blows to the head and had his coat torn in half. He was pulled from the crowd by women of the Portland Anti-Slavery Society who helped him escape through a back window. Spear was beaten nearly to death on the front steps of the meeting house. Local abolitionists took the men in and tended to their recuperation.

In 1843, he wrote the book The Brotherhood of Thieves; or A True Picture of the American Church and Clergy: A Letter to Nathaniel Barney, of Nantucket and in 1844 Foster's fellow abolitionist Parker Pillsbury published it through the Boston Anti-Slavery Office. The book went through twenty editions.

In 1844, Foster appeared in front of the New England Antislavery Convention holding an iron collar in one hand and iron manacles in the other. He said "Behold here a specimen of the religion of this land, the handiwork of the American church and clergy."

Foster and Abby Kelley Foster—along with Sojourner Truth, Jonathan Walker, Marius Robinson, and Sallie Holley—reorganized the Michigan Anti-Slavery Society in 1853 in Adrian, Michigan. The state society had been founded in 1836 in Ann Arbor, Michigan.

Foster was called a "come-outer", a phrase which denoted a person who dissented from religious orthodoxy. More specifically, it meant that Foster would not join a church which held a neutral position on the issue of slavery, and he would not take part in a government that let slavery happen. The phrase was derived from the Bible verse II Corinthians 6:17, which reads "Wherefore come out from among them, and be ye separate, said the Lord, and touch not the unclean thing; and I will receive you."

At the eclectic Free Convention in Rutland, Vermont, in June 1858, Foster spoke after Pillsbury to say "any law, constitution, court, or government, any church, priesthood, creed, or Bible, any Christ, or any God, that, by silence or otherwise, authorizes man to enslave man, merits the scorn and contempt of mankind."

== Marriage and fatherhood ==
In 1845, after a four-year courtship, Foster married Abby Kelley, a more famous social activist and a dynamic speaker who had occasionally joined with him on the abolitionist lecture circuit. They continued to travel and lecture together until the Civil War started in 1861. In early 1847, anticipating a family, the two bought a farm in Worcester, Massachusetts, and called it Liberty Farm; there they lived until Foster's death in 1881. The Fosters used the farm to shelter escaping slaves on the Underground Railroad.

On May 19, 1847, Paulina Wright "Alla" Foster was born at Liberty Farm, the only child that the couple would have. To care for the infant, Abby Kelley Foster stayed home at first, helped occasionally by her sister-in-law Caroline Foster. The young girl's parents soon found that they could lecture separately or together as long as Alla was being looked after; more often it was Abby Kelley Foster who left her husband watching the girl. Once when Alla was three, and her mother was out on a speaking tour, Stephen Symonds Foster was asked by Alla to buy her a harmonica and a churn, and Foster responded that he had little money, and could only buy her the necessities. Foster himself was about to leave on a speaking engagement and intended to send the girl to be cared for by her grandparents. Foster anticipated that she would be lonely and might need a toy wagon. Foster wrote to his wife, saying "I got the harmonica & wagon, & received for them a whole wagon load of kisses. She was careful, however, as she always is, to save some "for mother". I am struck with the fact that she always insists on your right to an equal part of every thing which I possess, if she attaches any value to it. One would almost think her specially commissioned to look after your rights, in your absence."

== Women's rights ==
In May 1850, Abby Kelley Foster went to Boston to take part in an annual Anti-Slavery Society meeting. Afterward, Abby met with ten others, including Wendell Phillips, William Lloyd Garrison, Harriot Kezia Hunt, Paulina Kellogg Wright Davis, and Lucy Stone, to help plan for a women's rights convention. They determined that it would be held near their Liberty Farm in Worcester. That October, both Foster and his wife were among the featured speakers at the first National Women's Rights Convention. The two spoke again at the annual convention in Cleveland, 1853, and in New York in 1856.

In 1869, amid tensions building up between factions of women's rights activists, Foster spoke out at a national meeting of the American Equal Rights Association (AERA) to accuse Elizabeth Cady Stanton of advocating "educated suffrage"—the right of upper-class white women to vote. Foster implied strongly that Stanton should step down as president of AERA. Henry Brown Blackwell tried to calm the waters by saying that all present, including Stanton and Susan B. Anthony, believed in "negro suffrage". Frederick Douglass widened the gap when he stood up and stated his position against Stanton's use in her address of the pejorative term 'Sambo'. The words of Foster and Douglass served to define a major split which separated women's rights activists into two camps: those like Stanton and Anthony who felt that educated women deserved the right to vote before or at the same time as uneducated men, and those like Stone, Douglass, and Foster, who felt that the political situation called for a drive to achieve suffrage for the African-American man, followed by a new focus on suffrage for women of all races.

== Later life ==
In 1874, Worcester city officials put Liberty Farm up for auction to pay back taxes. In a manner similar to prior protests made by women's rights activists such as Lucy Stone, the Fosters refused to pay taxes on the 65-acre (260,000 m^{2}) farm because Abby Kelley Foster was not given the right to vote and was thus subject to "taxation without representation". A sympathetic neighbor bid on the property and then allowed Foster to buy it back from him. This became a yearly event, as the Fosters never paid their taxes directly.

Foster died at Liberty Farm on September 12, 1881. A memorial service was held at the Worcester Horticultural Hall on September 24, with Reverend Samuel May, Jr., of Leicester, Massachusetts, presiding. Tributes to Foster's life and works were presented by Lucy Stone, Wendell Phillips, Reverend Henry T. Cheever, and Parker Pillsbury.
