= Lyman Goodnow =

Wisconsin Abolitionist and Underground Railroad Conductor

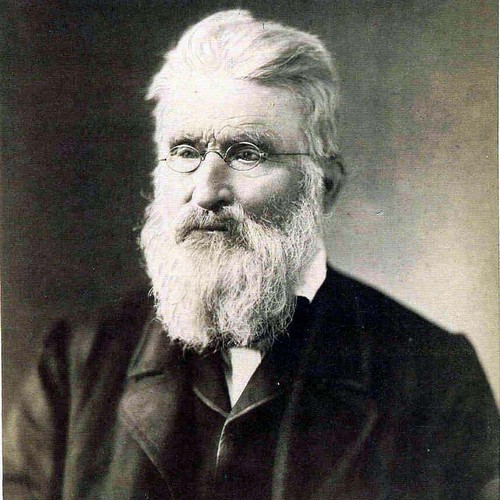
- Born: February 12, 1799; Rutland, Massachusetts
- Died: 1884 (aged 84–85)
- Burial place: Prairie Home Cemetery, Waukesha, Wisconsin
- Occupation: Quarry owner
- Known for: Underground journey of Caroline Quarlls from Wisconsin to Canada

Lyman Goodnow (1799–1884), a resident of Waukesha, Wisconsin, was a conductor on the Underground Railroad.

== Early life ==
Born to Asa and Lydia Warren Goodnow on February 12, 1799, Lyman Goodnow was a native of Rutland, Massachusetts. In 1805, his parents moved the family to the wilderness of Potsdam, New York. After school, he farmed before going to Canada to work as a lumberman. He moved to Lowell, Massachusetts where he worked in construction, and then worked for a railroad and followed by boating at Buffalo, New York. He moved to Wisconsin, where his sister Mrs. Allen Clinton and brother E.W. Goodnow had settled. He established a quarry at Frame Field in Prairieville (now Waukesha). He sold native stone and lime by 1840.

== Underground Railroad ==
Mary Ellen Snodgress states that he was a "pioneer and initiator of Underground Railroad activism in Wisconsin, most well-known for guiding Caroline Quarlls. In 1842, he guided 16-year-old Caroline Quarlls through Wisconsin, Illinois, Indiana, and Michigan into Canada. She was the first enslaved person to travel the Underground Railroad through Wisconsin. They traveled through stations on Wisconsin's Underground Railroad, including Prairieville (now Waukesha), Spring Prairie, and Gardner's Prairie near Burlington. They then traveled through Illinois, Indiana, and Michigan, while continuing to be pursued by slave hunters and lawyers. Quarlls and Goodnow stopped at the house of Guy Beckley in Ann Arbor, the last stop before Detroit where they crossed the Detroit River for Canada. Goodnow guided her 31 miles (50 km) into Canada. Abolitionists have given the two a purse of travel necessities to help the two cross the border. Her journey lasted five weeks throughout multiple states into Canada, where she lived free. Quarlls corresponded with Goodnow after she had married and raised her six children.

== Personal life ==
Goodnow was married in 1844. Heavy lifting at the quarry took its toll and Goodnow's health suffered. He was a member of the First Congregational Church of Waukesha, Wisconsin. In 1848, he moved to Omro, Wisconsin on what was previously Menominee lands. His third child was the first white child born on the lands. After more years of declining health, he returned to Waukesha in 1850.

He died in 1884 and was buried at the Prairie Home Cemetery. A bronze tablet was placed on Goodnow's grave by the Waukesha County Historical Society in 1934. The inscription is, "Erected to the memory of / 1799 - Lyman Goodnow - 1884 / First conductor of Wisconsin's underground railroad / In 1842 he conveyed Caroline Quarrels, / an escaped slave, to Canada and freedom."
