= Abby Kelley Foster =

American abolitionist and social reformer (1811–1887)

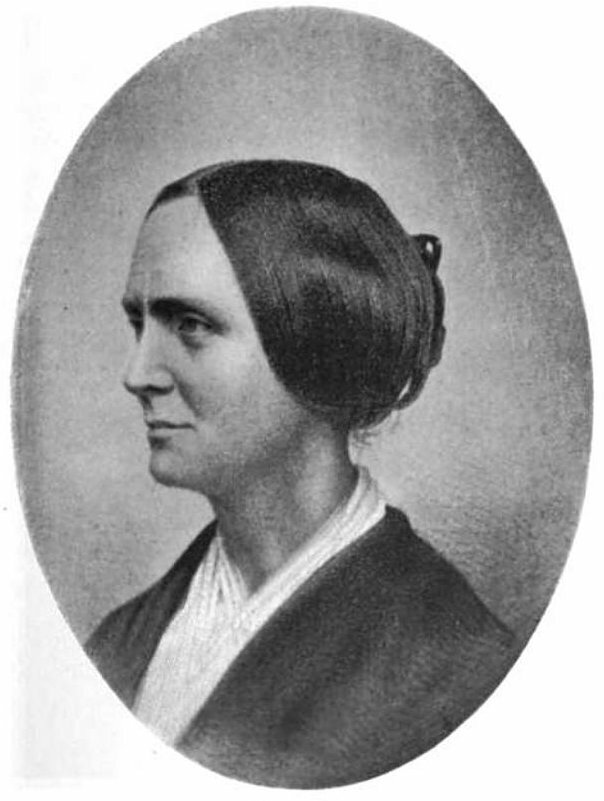
- Born: Abigail Kelley; January 15, 1811; Pelham, Massachusetts
- Died: January 14, 1887 (aged 75); Worcester, Massachusetts
- Other name: Abby Kelley
- Occupations: American abolitionist and women's suffragist
- Spouse: Stephen Symonds Foster (m. 1845)

Abigail Kelley Foster (née Kelley; January 15, 1811 – January 14, 1887) was an American abolitionist and radical social reformer active from the 1830s to 1870s. She became a fundraiser, lecturer and committee organizer for the influential American Anti-Slavery Society, where she worked closely with William Lloyd Garrison and other radicals. She married fellow abolitionist and lecturer Stephen Symonds Foster in 1845, and they both worked for equal rights for women and for Africans enslaved in the Americas.

Her former home of Liberty Farm in Worcester, Massachusetts, has been designated a National Historic Landmark.

== Early life ==
On January 15, 1811, Abigail (Abby) Kelley was born the seventh daughter of Wing and Lydia Kelley, farmers in Pelham, Massachusetts. Kelley grew up helping with the family farms in Worcester where she received a loving, yet strict Quaker upbringing. Kelley and her family were members of the Quaker Meeting in nearby Uxbridge, Massachusetts. She began her education in a single-room schoolhouse in the Tatnuck section of Worcester. Foster's daughter later wrote that Abby "attended the best private school for girls in Worcester." In 1826, as Worcester had no high school for girls and her parents could not afford a private seminary, Kelley continued her education at the New England Friends Boarding School in Providence, Rhode Island. After her first year of school, Kelley taught for two years to make enough money to further her education. In 1829, she attended her final year of schooling, having received the highest form of education any New England woman of her relatively moderate economic standing could hope to obtain.

Abby returned to her parents' home to teach in local schools and, in 1835, helped her parents move to their new home in Millbury. Then in 1836, she moved to Lynn, Massachusetts, where she taught at a local school. There she met fellow Quakers who preached the ideas of dietary restriction, temperance, pacifism, and antislavery. She became interested in the health theories of Sylvester Graham and gained a general interest in the abolition of slavery after hearing a lecture by William Lloyd Garrison, editor of the abolitionist publication The Liberator. Kelley joined the Female Anti-Slavery Society of Lynn and was soon elected to a committee charged with collecting signatures for petitions to the Federal government to end slavery in the District of Columbia. Kelley passionately carried out her assignment, and in 1837 collected the signatures of nearly half the women of Lynn.

== Radicalization ==
Kelley's views became progressively more radical as she worked with abolitionists such as Angelina Grimké. She became an "ultra", advocating not only the abolition of slavery but also full civil equality for black people. In addition, Garrison's influence led her to adopt the position of "non-resistance", which went beyond opposing war to opposing all forms of government coercion. Radical abolitionists led by Garrison refused to serve on juries, join the military or vote. The Garrisonian call for the end of slavery and the extension of civil rights to African Americans caused controversy. Kelley's advocacy of the radical abolitionist movement prompted some opponents to call her a "Jezebel", as what she proposed threatened their sense of social structure. On the other hand, many fellow abolitionists praised her public speaking skills and her dedication to the cause. Kelley's influence was shown by activist women being called "Abby Kelleyites". Radical abolitionism became known as "Abby Kelleyism."

== Anti-slavery activity ==
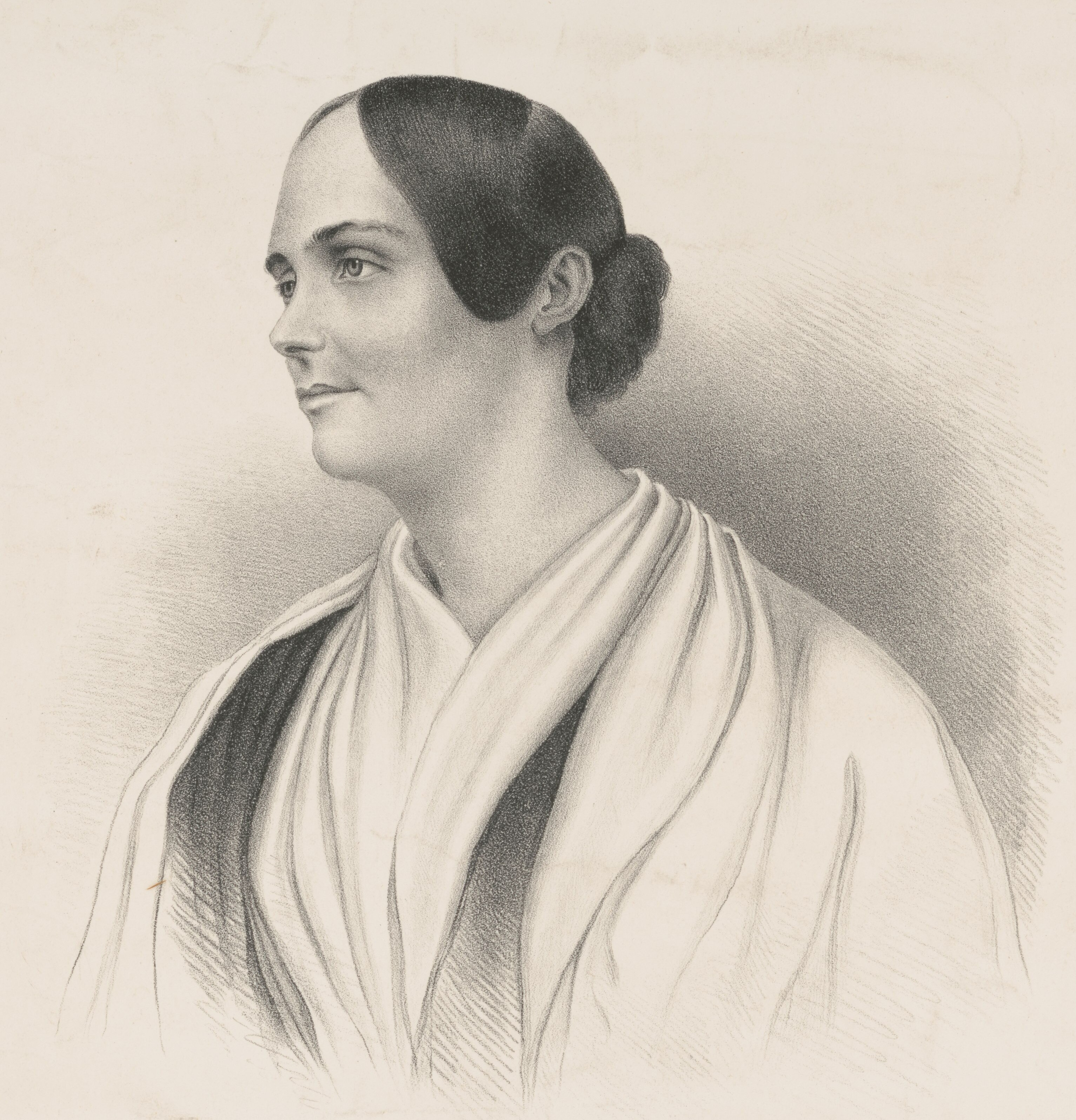
Abby Kelley Foster, c. 1846

Following the financial Panic of 1837, Kelley took charge of fundraising for the Lynn Female Society. She donated a generous portion of her own money to the American Anti-Slavery Society. With the encouragement of Angelina Grimke, Abby served as the Lynn Female Society's first delegate to the national convention of the Anti-Slavery Society in New York. There she spoke out about fundraising and participated in drafting the Society's declaration for abolition. After the convention, Kelley became even more engaged in the Anti-Slavery Society, for which she distributed petitions, raised funds, and participated in conferences to raise public awareness.

In 1838, Kelley gave her first public speech to a "promiscuous" (mixed-gender) audience at the first Anti-Slavery Convention of American Women, in Philadelphia. At this time women generally did not address such audiences in public forums. Despite vociferous protesters, Kelley eloquently proclaimed the doctrine of abolitionism. In the following months, she further established herself as a public figure by speaking to more mixed-gender crowds, such as that at the New England Anti-Slavery Convention. She also worked on a committee composed of both genders.

Later in 1838, she moved to Connecticut to spread the anti-slavery message. By 1839, Kelley was fully involved in the Anti-Slavery Society, while still acknowledging Quaker tradition by refusing payment for her efforts. In 1841, however, she resigned from the Quakers over disputes about not allowing anti-slavery speakers in meeting houses (including the Uxbridge monthly meeting where she had attended with her family), and the group disowned her.

In 1843, Kelley addressed the attendees at the Liberty Party convention in Buffalo, New York, becoming the first woman in America to speak at a national political convention.

In the following years, Kelley contributed to the Anti-Slavery Society as a lecturer and fundraiser. Although she encountered constant objections to her public activism as a woman working closely with and presenting public lectures to men, Kelley continued her work. She often shared her platform with formerly enslaved Africans despite disapproval by some in the audience. "I rejoice to be identified with the despised people of color. If they are to be despised, so ought their advocates to be". In October 1849, Kelley wrote to her friend, Milo Townsend, and told of the work she was doing for the anti-slavery society: "We know our cause is steadily onward".

Some male members of the Society objected to the ideas propounded by Garrison, Kelley, and other radicals. As a result, when Kelley was elected to the national business committee of the Anti-Slavery Society, conservative members left in protest. The two groups of abolitionists officially severed. Pacifist radical abolitionists controlled the Society, who promoted complete egalitarianism, to be obtained without the aid of any government, as all such institutions were constructed on the violence of war. In 1854 Kelley became the Anti-Slavery Society's chief fundraiser and general financial agent, and in 1857 she took the position of general agent in charge of lecture and convention schedules.

Kelley and her husband Stephen Symonds Foster – along with Sojourner Truth, Jonathan Walker, Marius Robinson, and Sallie Holley – reorganized the Michigan Anti-Slavery Society in 1853 in Adrian, Michigan. The state society was founded in 1836 in Ann Arbor, Michigan.

== Women's rights ==
Fighting for women's rights soon became a new priority for many ultra abolitionists and Kelley was among them. She spoke on women's rights in Seneca Falls, New York, five years before the Seneca Falls Convention would be held there. Kelley influenced future suffragists such as Susan B. Anthony and Lucy Stone by encouraging them to take on a role in political activism. She helped organize and was a key speaker at the first National Women's Rights Convention in Worcester, Massachusetts, in 1850. (The Seneca Falls Convention, the first women's rights convention, held in 1848, was not national).

After the American Civil War, Kelley supported passage of the 15th Amendment to the Constitution. Some female activists resisted any amendment that did not include women's suffrage. Kelley split with Susan B. Anthony and Elizabeth Cady Stanton due to their strong opposition to the amendment. After the amendment passed and Garrison dissolved the Anti-Slavery Society, Kelley continued to work for equal rights for both African Americans and women.

In 1872, Kelley and her husband Stephen Symonds Foster refused to pay taxes on their jointly owned property; they argued that as Kelley could not vote, she was a victim of taxation without representation. Although their farm was consequently seized and sold and repurchased for them by friends, Kelley continued her activism in the face of financial difficulties and poor health. She wrote letters to fellow radicals and other political figures until her death in 1887.

== Marriage and family ==
After a four-year courtship, Kelley married fellow abolitionist Stephen Symonds Foster in 1845. In 1847, she and her husband purchased a farm in the Tatnuck region of Worcester, Massachusetts, and named it "Liberty Farm". She gave birth to their only daughter in 1847. The farm served both as a stop on the Underground Railroad and as a refuge for fellow reformers. Kelley continued her efforts as a lecturer and fundraiser throughout the North until 1850, when declining health forced her to reduce traveling. She carried on an active correspondence and local meetings to work for the cause.

Abby Kelley Foster died January 14, 1887, one day before her 76th birthday.

== Legacy and honors ==
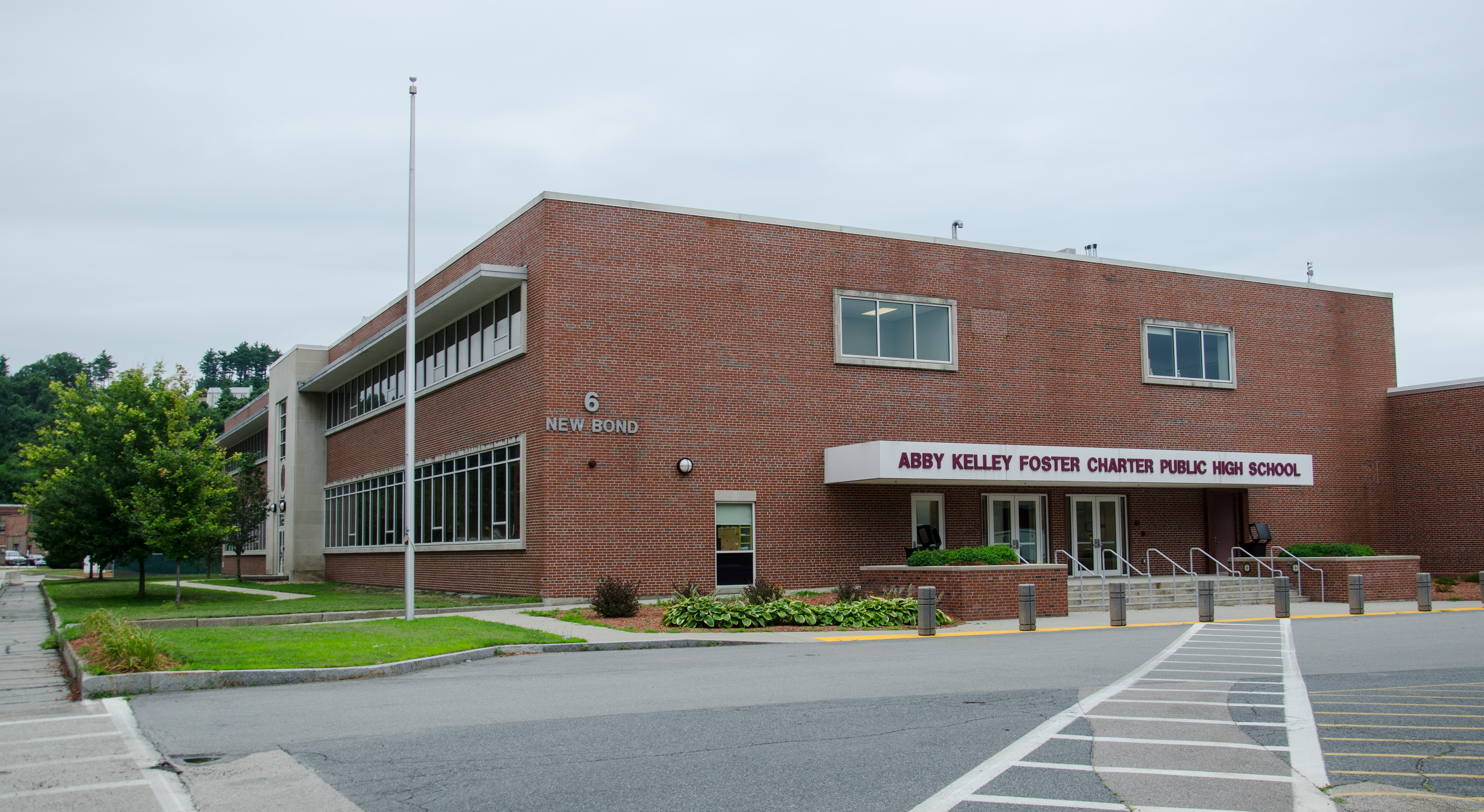
Abby Kelley Foster Charter Public School

Liberty Farm in Worcester, Massachusetts, the home of Abby Kelley and Stephen Symonds Foster, was designated a National Historic Landmark because of its association with their lives of working for abolitionism. It is privately owned and not open for visits.

Abby's House, a shelter for women that opened in Worcester in 1976, is named in her honor.

In 2011, she was inducted into the National Women's Hall of Fame. she was also inducted in 2011 to the National Abolition Hall of Fame.

Abby Kelley Foster Charter Public School, a K-12 school in Worcester, Massachusetts, that opened in 1998, is named in her honor.

== See also ==
- List of civil rights activists
- List of suffragists and suffragettes
- List of women's rights activists
- Come-outer
