= Liberty Farm =

Historic house in Massachusetts, United States

- U.S. National Register of Historic Places
- U.S. National Historic Landmark
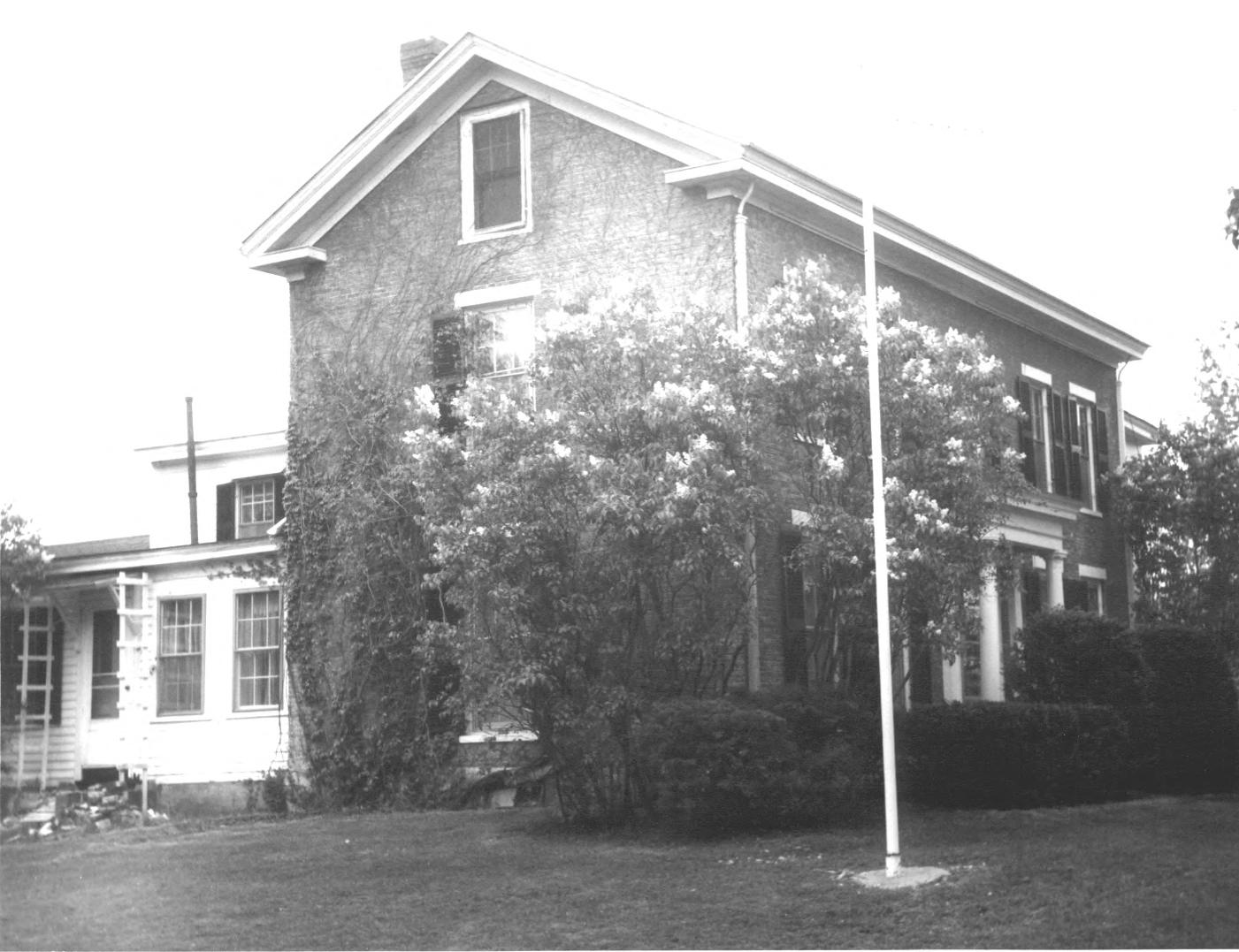
- Liberty Farm in 1973

- Location within Massachusetts Location within the United States
- Location: Worcester, Massachusetts
- Coordinates: 42°16′50″N 71°51′36″W
- Built: c. 1810
- Architectural style: Federal
- MPS: Worcester MRA
- NRHP reference No.: 74002046

Significant dates
- Added to NRHP: September 13, 1974
- Designated NHL: May 30, 1974

Liberty Farm is a National Historic Landmark at 116 Mower Street in Worcester, Massachusetts. Built c. 1810, it was the home for most of their married life of Abby Kelley Foster (1810–1887) and Stephen Symonds Foster (1809-1881), early vocal abolitionists and women's rights activists. The Fosters used their house as a shelter on the Underground Railroad, and famously refused to pay taxes on the property because Abby was unable to vote. The property, a private residence not open to the public, was designated a National Historic Landmark in 1974. In 2018 the building was sold off to a local family.

== Description and history ==
Liberty Farm is a 2 1/2-story Federal style brick house, built around 1810, and now stands in a suburban area of western Worcester, Massachusetts. Its main block is five bays wide, with a center entry sheltered by a portico supported by Doric columns. The doorway is flanked by sidelight windows and topped by a fanlight. A wood-frame addition extends to the right of the main block, and another extends to the rear; these were apparently added in the early 20th century. The interior of the main house has been well-preserved, and has particularly elegant fireplace surrounds.

Abby Kelley Foster was born in Pelham, Massachusetts, raised in the Quaker faith, and first became a teacher at a Quaker school in Lynn, Massachusetts. By the 1830s she became active in the local anti-slavery society, and began speaking in favor the immediate emancipation of slaves. In 1838 she left her teaching position and dedicated herself to the causes of ending slavery and achieving women's suffrage. She became a close friend of William Lloyd Garrison, one of the leaders of the antislavery movement. In 1840 she was elected to the executive committee of the American Anti-Slavery Society, over the objections of conservative members who disapproved of women in leadership roles. She traveled widely across the northern United States, speaking out against slavery and on behalf of women's rights.

Stephen Symonds Foster had grown up in New Hampshire, and had also become involved in the antislavery cause, working with Garrison. The two met sometime in the early 1840s, and were married in 1845. Both remained forceful activists for their cause, but had to curtail their activity when their only child was born in 1847. This was the same year they purchase Liberty Farm.

The Fosters ran what was described as one of the most prosperous farms in the area, but also used the property to further their political activities. They sheltered escaping slaves as a station on the Underground Railroad, and refused to pay taxes on the property because Abby could not vote. This latter form of civil disobedience resulted in the property's sale at tax auctions on several occasions; however, it was purchased by their supporters and given back to them. The Fosters lived at Liberty Farm until Stephen's death in 1881, after which Abby lived with her sister in Worcester.

== See also ==
- List of Underground Railroad sites
- List of National Historic Landmarks in Massachusetts
- National Register of Historic Places listings in northwestern Worcester, Massachusetts
- National Register of Historic Places listings in Worcester County, Massachusetts
