= Signal of Liberty =

Anti-slavery newspaper in Ann Arbor, Michigan 1841–1848

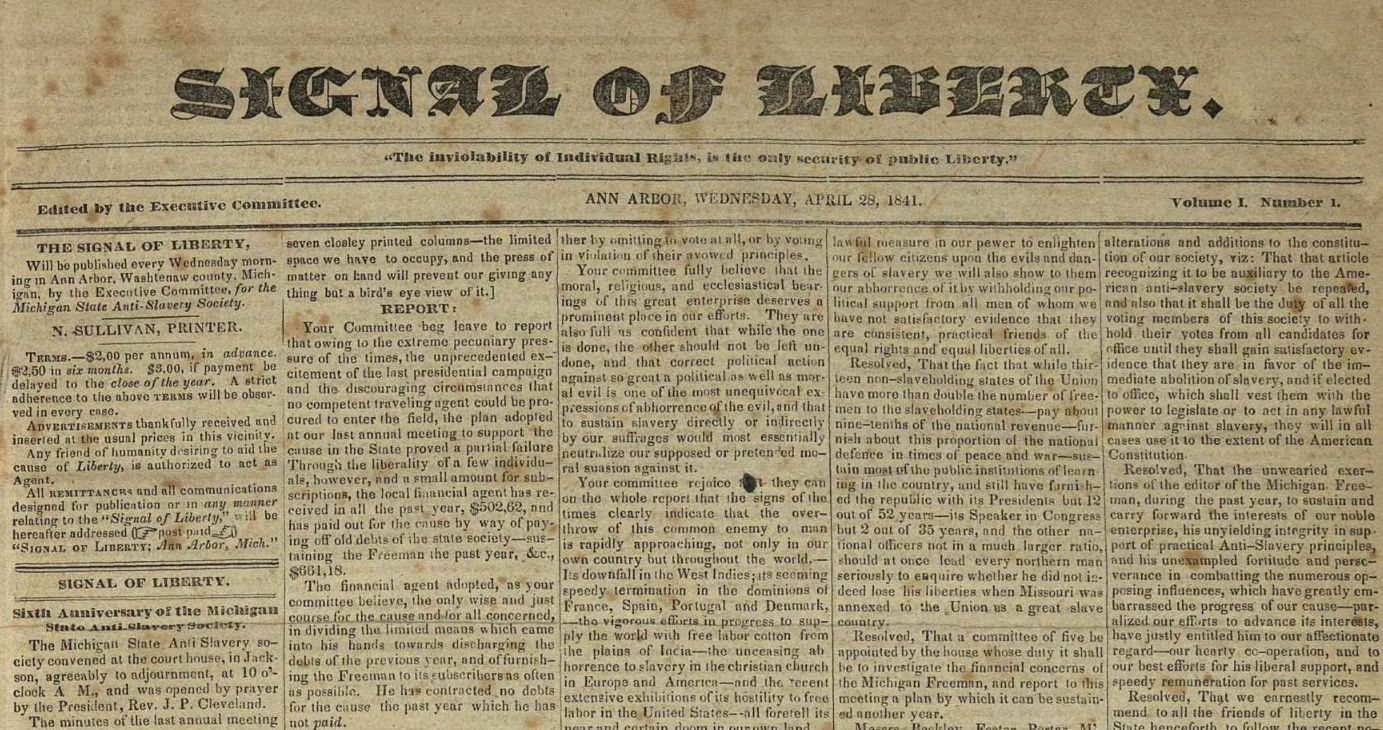
- Front page of the first issue, dated April 28, 1841
- Type: Abolitionist newspaper
- Editor: Guy Beckley; Theodore Foster
- Founded: 1841
- Ceased publication: 1848
- City: Ann Arbor, Michigan
- Country: United States
- OCLC number: 9500153

The Signal of Liberty was an anti-slavery newspaper published in the mid-19th century in Michigan.

== History ==
The decision to publish a newspaper was one of the outcomes of the founding meeting of the Michigan Anti-Slavery Society that met for several days beginning on November 10, 1836 in Ann Arbor of the Michigan Territory (1805–1837). In 1838, Nicholas and William Sullivan published Michigan's first antislavery newspaper, the American Freedmen in Jackson, Michigan. Seymour Treadwell published and was the editor of the Michigan Freeman in 1839. The papers did not have a regular printing schedule.

The Signal of Liberty was published weekly from April 1841 to 1848 in Ann Arbor by Rev. Guy Beckley and Theodore Foster, who were co-editors. It was printed on Broadway Avenue on the second floor of Josiah Beckley's mercantile shop.

== Content ==
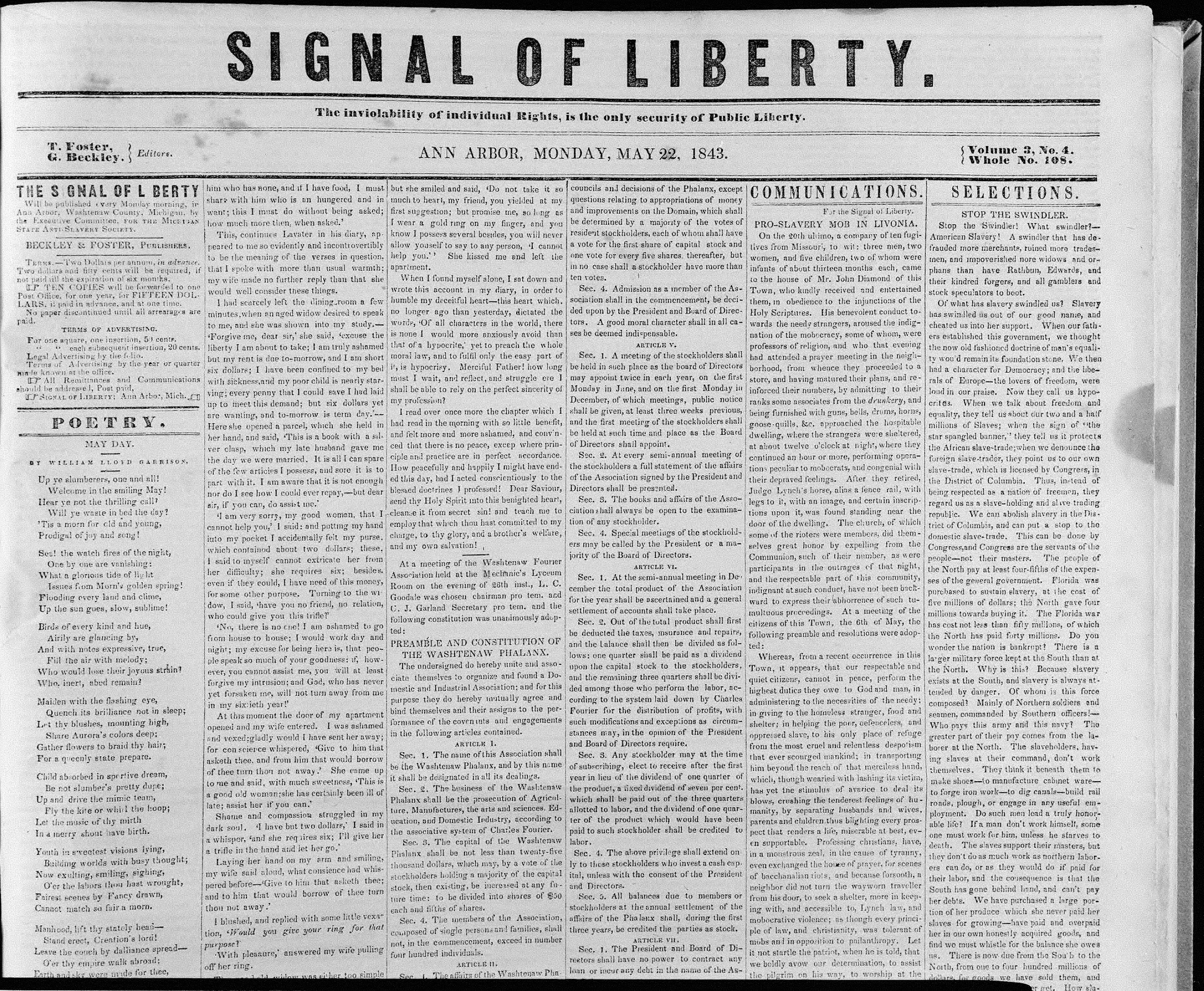
Front page of the May 22, 1843 issue

The purpose of the newspaper was to encourage anti-slavery sentiment by sharing the stories of the lives of enslaved people. They interviewed freedom seekers who left their slaveholders and passed through or settled in Michigan. When African Americans escaped slavery, they were often pursued by slave catchers. The Signal of Liberty covered the stories of "kidnapping outrages" like the Kentucky raid in Cass County (1847), the Crosswhite Affair in Marshall, and raids that occurred in Detroit.

There were regular sections in the paper for national news, antislavery society news, and poetry. It announced antislavery societies that were established throughout Michigan. The newspaper served its subscribers in Michigan and the Midwest. After the newspaper closed, Michigan Liberty Press was published.

Promoting antislavery messages could be dangerous. Throughout the 1830s, anti-slavery lecturers faced angry crowds. Abolitionist Elijah Parish Lovejoy was killed in Alton, Illinois, by a pro-slavery mob in the fall of 1837 after he refused to give up his printing press.

== See also ==
- The Liberator (newspaper)
