= Samuel Brown (Wisconsin politician) =

American pioneer and politician

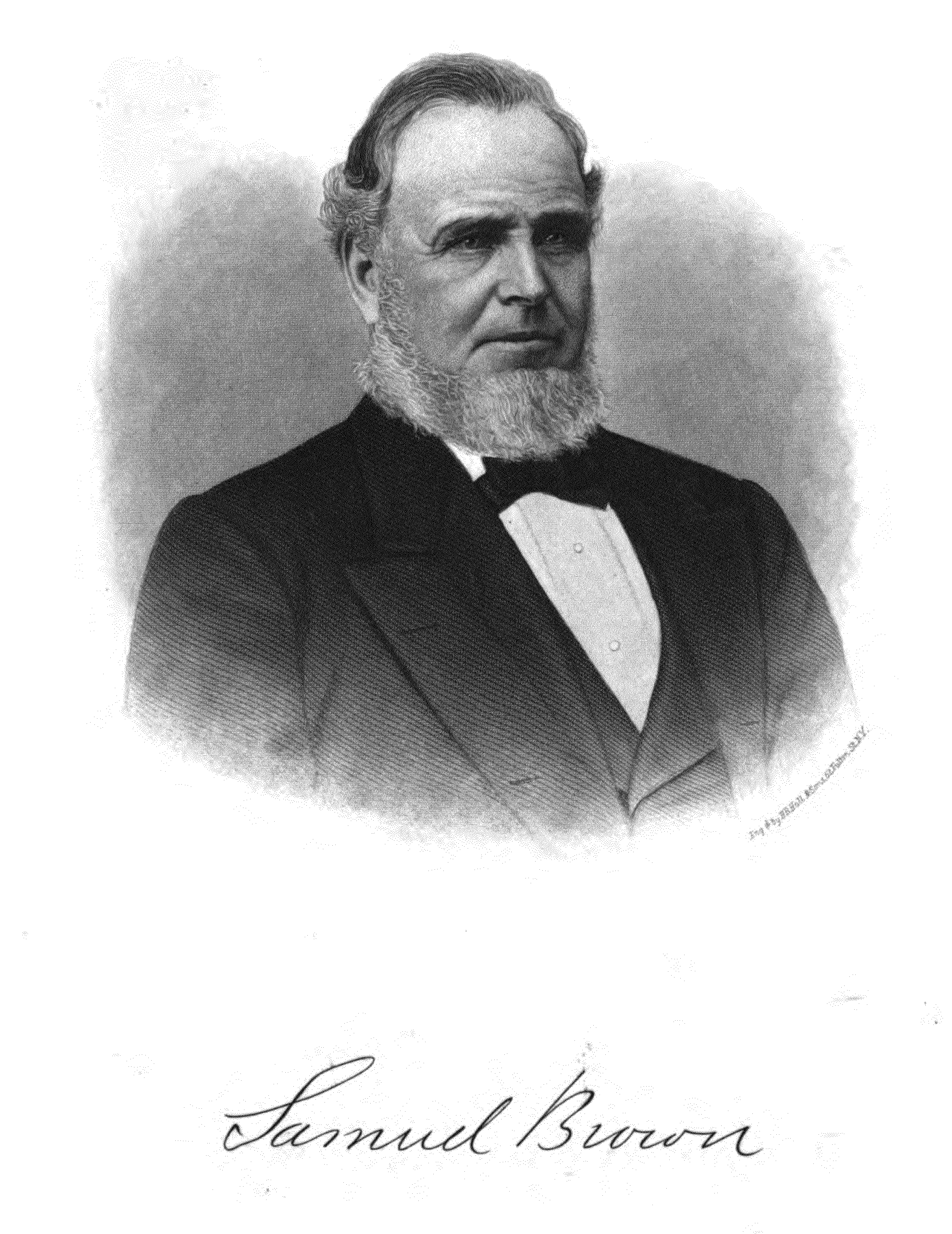
Samuel "Deacon" Brown

Samuel Brown (January 8, 1804 – December 22, 1874) was an American pioneer and politician in Milwaukee, Wisconsin.

== Background and arrival in Wisconsin Territory ==
Brown was born in Belchertown, Massachusetts, and grew up on a farm in the area. At age 18 he left the farm to learn the carpentry trade, and in 1833 moved to Chicago, Illinois to work as a builder. In 1834, he came to Milwaukee in the Wisconsin Territory at the request of Solomon Juneau, making the trip together with Horace Chase and Morgan L. Burdick. Brown moved with his family and settled permanently in Milwaukee in 1835, and worked as a builder along with his brother Daniel, including building a store for Juneau at the corner of Water Street and Wisconsin Avenue, and the first county courthouse of Milwaukee County. He built himself a log cabin on Cherry Street, between Second and Third streets, which was one of the first white settlers' homes built in what was to become Milwaukee. On September 16, 1835, he was the first purchaser of a building lot in Kilbourntown.

== Religion and abolitionism ==
Milwaukeeans called him "Deacon Brown", since he held the first public religious exercises in Milwaukee in May 1835. Brown helped to found the city's First Presbyterian Church on April 11, 1837, and later Plymouth Congregational on May 20, 1841. Brown served as an elder at both churches. He lived in a house bounded by Galena, Cherry, Second, and Third Streets.

By 1842, he had settled on an extensive farm in the area including what is now Johnson Park on Fond du Lac Avenue between 17th and 20th Streets, where he would live the rest of his life. In July of that year, this farm was a predecessor to the Underground Railroad, and provided refuge to Caroline Quarlls, a 16-year-old runaway slave from a plantation in St. Louis, and the first documented of many such fugitives who would escape to freedom in Canada through Wisconsin.

== Public offices ==
In the first election held in Milwaukee in September 1835, with less than 60 voters, Brown was elected one of three "commissioners of schools" (school board members).

Brown was elected treasurer, commissioner of highways and commissioner of schools for the Town of Milwaukee when that was split off from the new City of Milwaukee in 1846, although the city would later grow to encompass his home once more.

He was elected to a one-year term in the Wisconsin State Assembly of the 3rd Wisconsin Legislature as a Freesoiler or "Free Democrat" in 1850 (succeeding Robert Wason Jr.), and also served on the Milwaukee Common Council.

== Business and finance; reputation, death and legacy ==
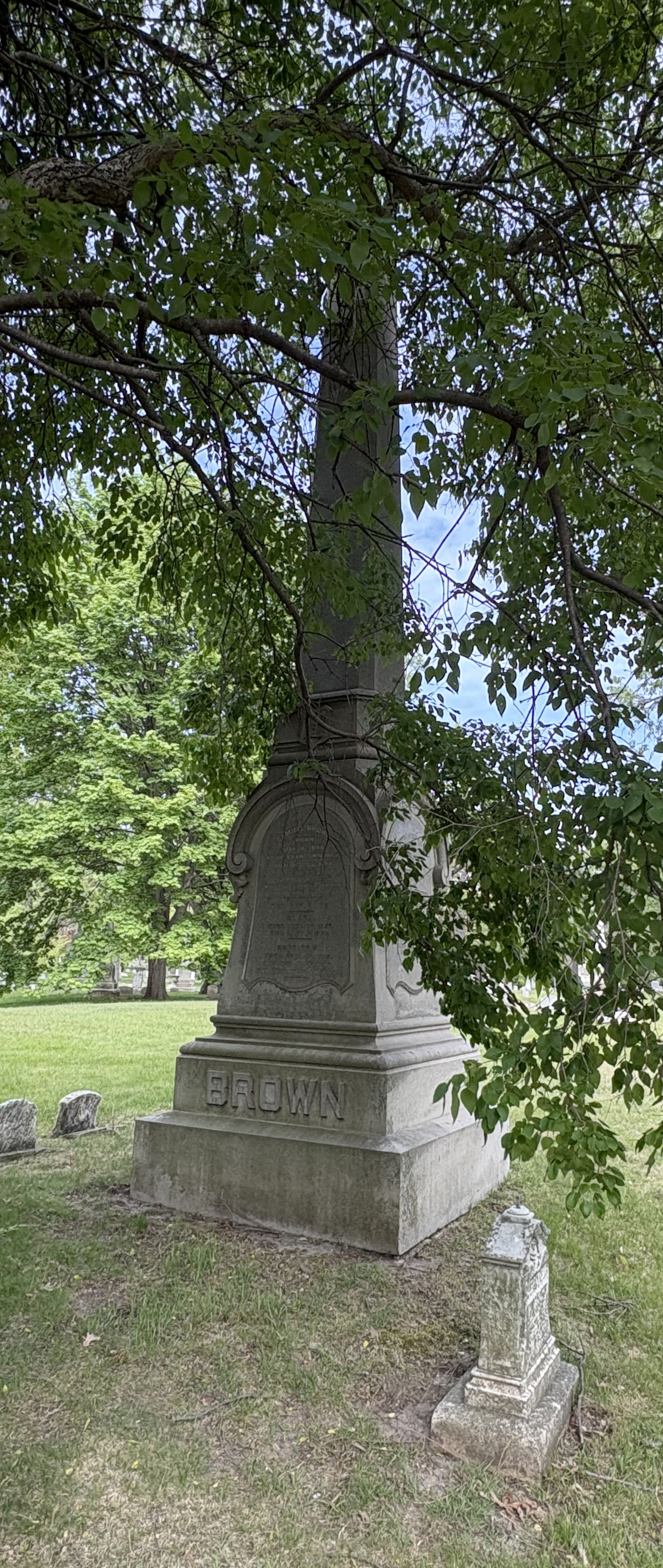
Brown's grave at Forest Home Cemetery

Brown retained ownership of his early land purchases longer than most early settlers, and as a result became wealthy. By the time of his death, the city's expansion had already encompassed much of his old farm on Fond du Lac, or would soon do so. He was a member of the board of directors of Byron Kilbourn's abortive Milwaukee and Rock River Canal Company, as he would later be on that of the Milwaukee and La Crosse Railway.

James Buck's Pioneer History of Milwaukee County published in 1876 just after Brown's death, described him thus:

In person Deacon Brown was tall, with a large frame, capable of great endurance; he had dark brown hair, dark blue eyes, a soft voice, almost feminine in its tone; he spoke short and quick, walked with a quick, state stride, his eyes usually cast upon the ground, as though in deep thought; he was somewhat reticent and company; kept his own counsel, never interfering, unasked, with the affairs of others; was regular and methodical in all he did; a good financier; quick to see and quick to decide; and as a companionable man unexcelled.

Perhaps no person has ever lived in Milwaukee with so positive character as Deacon Brown, who had so few enemies, or to whom more people have applied in the hour of trouble, domestic or pecuniary, for advice, than to him. Many a lawsuit has been prevented by his influence. He was a peacemaker, always.

He was a man of the strictest morals and rectitude; neither would he countenance wrongdoing others. He was also a firm champion of temperance; and his word once given was never violated; neither would he go in debt if it could be avoided, always paying as he went. He was also a prominent member of the Old Settlers' Club.

Brown died in 1874. His son Thomas H. Brown later served as mayor of Milwaukee. Both are buried at Forest Home Cemetery.
