= Guy Beckley =

American minister and abolitionist (1803–1847)

- Born: 1803; Weathersfield, Vermont, US
- Died: December 26, 1847 (aged 43–44); Ann Arbor, Michigan, US
- Occupations: Methodist Episcopal minister, abolitionist, Underground Railroad person
- Building details

General information
- Architectural style: New England Georgian
- Location: 1425 Pontiac Trail, Ann Arbor, Michigan
- Coordinates: 42°17′43″N 83°44′17″W

Design and construction
- Designations: Underground Railroad Network to Freedom
- Known for: Underground Railroad station

Website
- Guy Beckley House

Guy Beckley (1803–1847) was a Methodist Episcopal minister, abolitionist, Underground Railroad stationmaster, and lecturer. The Guy Beckley House is on the National Park Service Underground Railroad Network to Freedom and the Journey to Freedom tour. It stands next to Beckley Park, which was named after him.

== Early life and preacher ==
He was born in Weathersfield, Vermont. He attended the Methodist Episcopal Church and became a preacher at the age of 19. He was a traveling preacher for nine years for the Methodist Church. Beckley began his career in 1827, when he was admitted on trial to the New England Methodist Conference and was assigned to Rev. William McCoy of Rochester, Vermont. He was ordained a deacon in 1830 and an elder in 1831. He was a minister at the Newfane church in Vermont.

== Anti-slavery lecturer and recruiter ==
Beckley was a paid lecturer for the American Anti-Slavery Society, traveling throughout New York and New England for three years. He reported that the Society purchased the freedom of twelve enslaved people in 1837.

After moving to Ann Arbor around 1840, he continued to lecture against slavery and he recruited residents of Washtenaw County, Michigan to support the Underground Railroad. He sat on the executive committee and was the vice president of the Michigan State Anti-Slavery Society.

== Underground Railroad ==
Although it was a federal crime (Fugitive Slave Act of 1793), subject to six months in jail and a $1,000 fine (equivalent to $33,362 in 2025) if caught, he operated an Underground Railroad waystation at 1425 Pontiac Trail beginning in 1842. His house had lower ceilings in his second-story closets that provided niches to hide enslaved people. One of the people that he aided was 16-year-old Caroline Quarlls, who was guided by conductor Lyman Goodnow in 1842. Quarlls' ultimate destination was Canada. Josiah and Minerva Bird Beckley, his brother and sister-in-law, were farmers who operated a waystation at 1709 Pontiac Trail. Beckley had 28 acres of land that adjoined his brother's property.

His New England Georgian style house is located on the National Park Service Underground Railroad Network to Freedom and the Journey to Freedom tour. Located near the house is Beckley Park that was named after him.

== Publisher and editor ==
He published and was co-editor of The Signal of Liberty (formerly the Michigan Freeman) with Theodore Foster from 1841 to 1847. It published stories of formerly enslaved people, like Robert Coxe, who settled in Adrian, Michigan and people who went through Michigan to Canada on the Underground Railroad.

== Personal life and death ==
Beckley was married twice. On June 8, 1830, he was married to Caroline Walker in Springfield, Vermont. She was the daughter of Philenia Spencer and John Walker. The Beckleys had six children together and Caroline died in 1839. In 1839 or 1840, he moved with his wife Phyla and eight children from Vermont to Ann Arbor, Michigan,

Beckley died at his house in Ann Arbor on December 26, 1847, at which time his oldest child was 15. His wife Phyla died three years later.
