= Caroline Quarlls =

Freedom Seeker

Caroline Quarlls Watkins
- The only known photograph of Quarlls to exist.
- Born: Caroline Quarlls; 1826; St. Louis, Missouri, United States
- Died: 1892 (aged 65–66); Sandwich, Ontario, Canada
- Known for: The first known enslaved person to escape on Wisconsin's Underground Railroad
- Spouse: Alan [Allen] Watkins
- Children: 6
- Parents: Robert Prior Quarlls (father); Maria (mother)
- Relatives: Charles Hall (Uncle)

Caroline Quarlls (1826–1892) was the first enslaved person to travel through Wisconsin using the Underground Railroad. She escaped bondage in St. Louis, Missouri in 1842. Multiple abolitionists, including Lyman Goodnow, helped Caroline on her journey to Canada even as pursuers followed continuously. Quarlls' journey ended in Sandwich, Ontario (the same year she fled). She married Alan Watkins, a freedman, becoming Caroline Quarlls Watkins. Thirty-eight years later, Quarlls penned two letters with Goodnow, providing information about her family lineage, life while enslaved, and her journey to freedom.

== Early life and family ==
Caroline Quarlls was born in St. Louis in 1826, enslaved by her paternal grandfather, Dr. Robert Quarlls. According to an article published by the Windsor Star, Dr. Quarlls served as a captain in the Revolutionary War who received land in Missouri as his pension. Dr. Quarlls' son, Robert Pryor Quarlls (also Quarles), was both her father and owner. Caroline's mother was an enslaved woman named Maria. Her mother had married an African American man who was born free and made a living as a successful blacksmith. Caroline had been in contact with her stepfather who was very kind to her and talked with her about her plans to escape slavery. Maria and another daughter had passed by the time Caroline reached sixteen.

Quarlls looked like her half-siblings, but was not granted the same freedom as they were. Goodnow, the abolitionist who helped Quarlls reach Canada, described her as having "a straight nose, thin lips, skin not very dark, and a slender form of medium height." Upon her father's death, Caroline was acquired by her new mistress, Robert's sister and her aunt, Miss Charles R. Hall. As an enslaved teenager, Caroline was responsible for sewing and embroidery work as well as "probably to wait upon her mistress." Quarlls received punishment, being "occasionally whipped." Caroline knew freedom in the North was possible and had thought about what escaping enslavement would look like.

== Flight ==
When Quarlls was sixteen years old, her mistress, Miss Hall, became angry with her and cut her hair off as punishment. Determined to escape such assaults, she managed to gain permission from her mistress to see a friend of hers who was in poor health. On July 4, 1842, the 16-year-old threw a bundle of clothes out a window, retrieved them, and walked down to the ferry to begin her journey along what would later be known as the Underground Railroad. Caroline had saved $100 cash that she had been gifted from family and from small sewing jobs. She used these funds to purchase a ticket for a steamboat to Alton, Illinois. Of mixed race, she was able to pass as a white girl. She traveled by stagecoach through Illinois to Milwaukee. She was pursued by slave catchers for the $300 (equivalent to $10,009 in 2025) bounty placed on her.

After staying around a week at the home of Robert Titball, a formerly enslaved barber, Titball told slavecatching-lawyers that Quarlls had been staying at his home. A Black boy who worked for him alerted Quarlls at Titball's bidding but did not take her to the place the barber suggested. Instructed by prominent attorney Asahel Finch, Quarlls hid inside an old barrel to escape capture. From Milwaukee, Quarlls was brought to Pewaukee, Wisconsin by Samuel Brown; the two traveled via an old rickety wagon. Quarlls and Brown arrived in Lisbon, Wisconsin where Quarlls was to stay with Samuel and Lucinda Daugherty until she could be guided safely on the remainder of her escape to Canada. Lyman Goodnow, a resident of Prairieville (now Waukesha) and a conductor on the Underground Railroad, assisted Quarlls from Prairieville to Sandwich, Ontario. At times she walked, and other times she hid under hay in a horse-drawn wagon. There were days of dusty trails and other times heavy rain. They traveled through stations on Wisconsin's Underground Railroad, including Prairieville (now Waukesha), Spring Prairie and Gardner's Prairie near Burlington and on to Illinois. The clerk of the steamboat that Quarlls took to Alton was liable to pay her master $800 (equivalent to $26,690 in 2025) if Quarlls was not found. Goodnow and Quarlls learned that the clerk was traveling through Illinois looking for her, too. At a schoolhouse at Beebe's Grove, Quarlls asked about the "liberty pole" near where she was standing. She learned that it was common in villages in the North as a commemoration of the birth of liberty in the United States. Quarlls asked, "How can it commemorate liberty in a country where there is no liberty; where more than one-fifth of the inhabitants are in bondage?"

They traveled through Illinois, Indiana, and Michigan, while continuing to be pursued by slave hunters and lawyers. Quarlls and Goodnow stopped at the house of Guy Beckley in Ann Arbor, the last stop before Detroit where they crossed the Detroit River for Canada. Goodnow guided her 31 miles (50 km) into Canada. Abolitionists have given the two a purse of travel necessities to help the two cross the border. Her journey lasted five weeks throughout multiple states into Canada.

== Life in Canada ==
After arriving in Canada, Caroline attended school during her first year in Canada. After three years, she married an older widower, Allen Watkins, himself a freed slave. From Virginia and Kentucky, he had children with his first wife. He was a cook and Quarlls and her husband made a good living for their family through hard work. She had learned that she had been left property, which she would have received if she had remained in St. Louis until she became of age. The Watkins raised three boys and three girls, who all had good educations.

She corresponded with Goodnow, stating,

Dearest Friend: Pen and ink could hardly express my joy when I heard from you once more. I am living and have to work very hard, but I have never forgotten you nor your kindness. I am still in Sandwich—the same place where you left me. Just as soon as the Postmaster read the name to me—your name—my heart filled with joy and gladness and I should like to see you once more before I die, to return thanks for your kindness toward me. I would like for you to send me one of the books you were speaking about.

— Caroline Watkins, Sandwich, Ontario

Caroline Quarlls Watkins died in Sandwich in March 1888 or 1892.

== Legacy ==
Quarlls' descendants continue to tell her story today. In 2003, Kimberly Simmons discovered she was related to Quarlls as her great-great-great-granddaughter. Simmons joined the National Underground Railroad Network to Freedom to tell the story of Quarlls' self-emancipation journey. In 2019, Simmons wrote (with the assistance of McClellan) To the River, a book about Quarlls' familial connections that trace to people such as Meriwether Lewis, Langston Hughes, and even people who signed the Declaration of Independence.

An image and transcription of a letter Quarlls wrote to abolitionist, Lyman Goodnow (dated April 27, 1880) can be accessed through an online database about black history in Sandwich, Ontario (where Quarlls ended her journey and lived for the remainder of her life) titled "Across the River to Freedom: Early Black History in Sandwich, Ontario."

== See also ==
- Lyman Goodnow
- Underground Railroad
