= Holley Graded School =

- U.S. National Register of Historic Places
- Virginia Landmarks Register
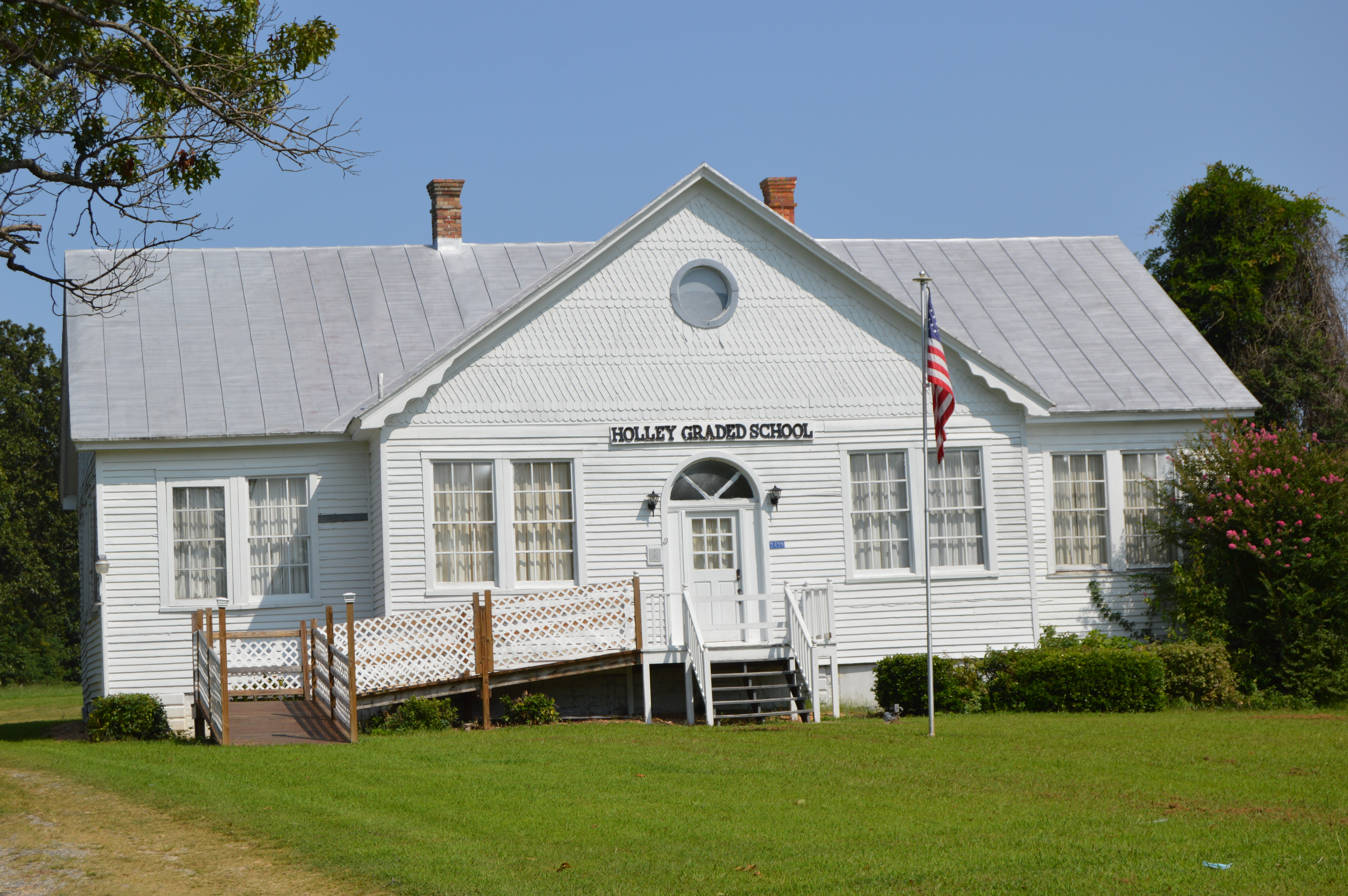
- Front of the school

- Location within Virginia Location within the United States
- Location: U.S. Route 360 at Lottsburg, Virginia
- Coordinates: 37°57′47″N 76°31′09″W
- Area: 2 acres (0.81 ha)
- Built: c. 1914-1933
- NRHP reference No.: 89001934
- VLR No.: 066-0112

Significant dates
- Added to NRHP: December 19, 1990
- Designated VLR: April 18, 1989

Holley Graded School is a historic school building for African American students located at Lottsburg, Northumberland County, Virginia. It was built in stages between about 1914 and 1933, and is a one-story, cross-shaped plan building. It features four identical-sized classrooms, a central passage, two cloakrooms and a kitchen. It was used as a schoolhouse until 1959, and subsequently used as a combination museum and adult-education facility.

It was listed on the National Register of Historic Places in 1990.
