= Lottsburg, Virginia =

Unincorporated community in Virginia, United States

Coordinates: 37°57′39″N 76°31′08″W

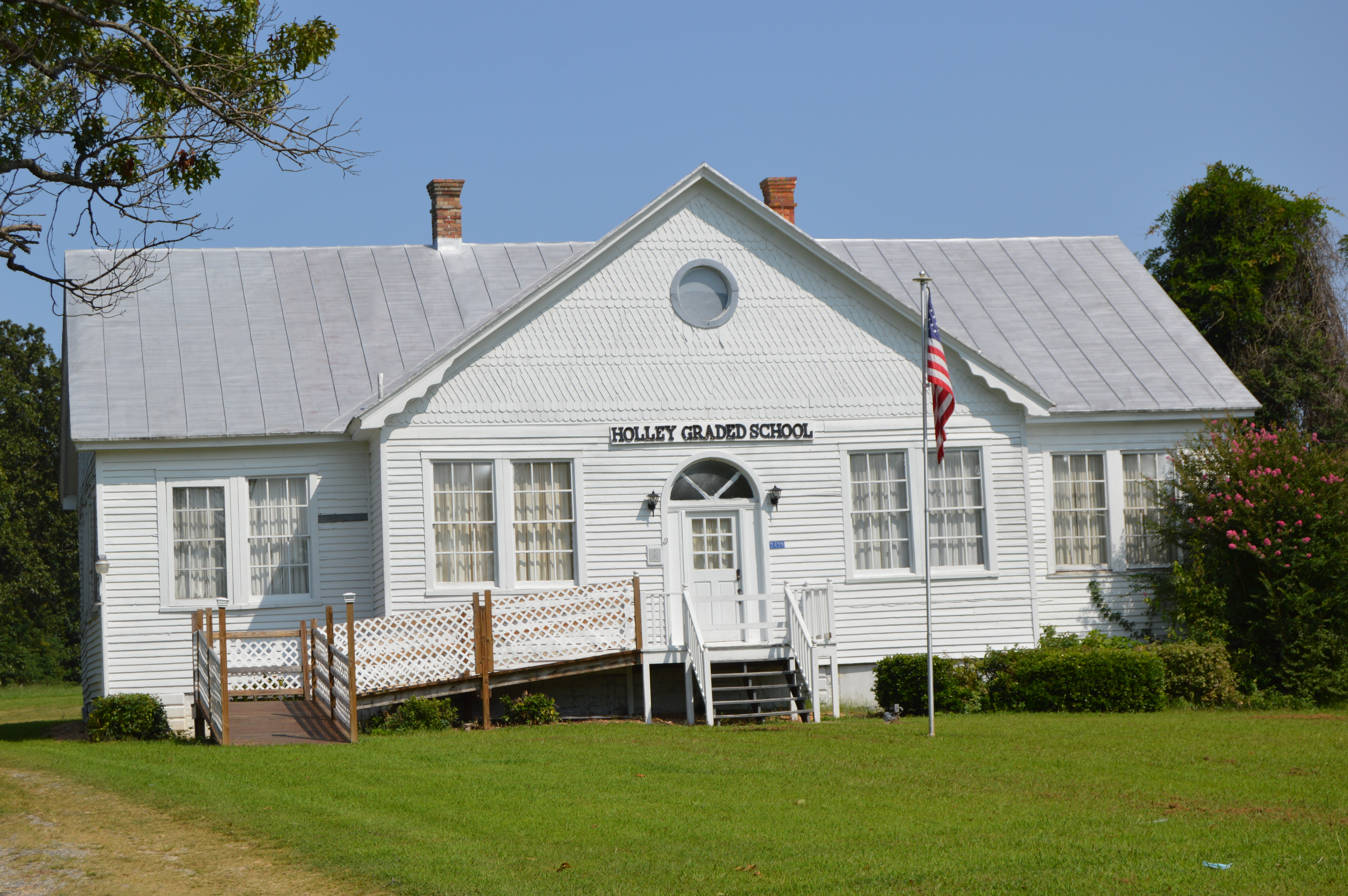
Holley Graded School

Lottsburg is an unincorporated community in Northumberland County, in the U.S. state of Virginia.
