= 1848 United States presidential election in New York =

- November 7, 1848
- Turnout: 79.6% ▼12.5 pp
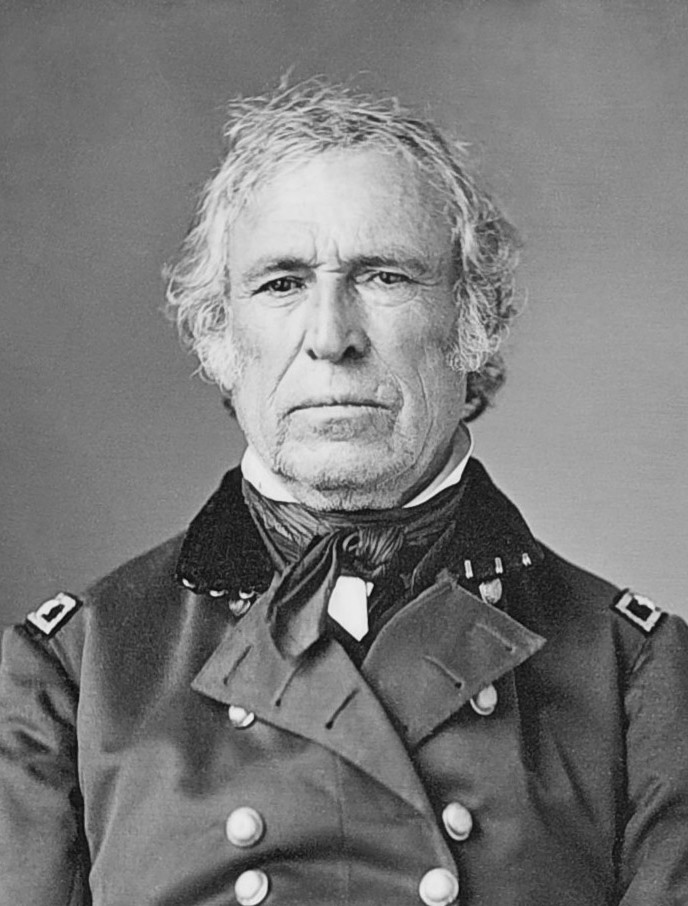

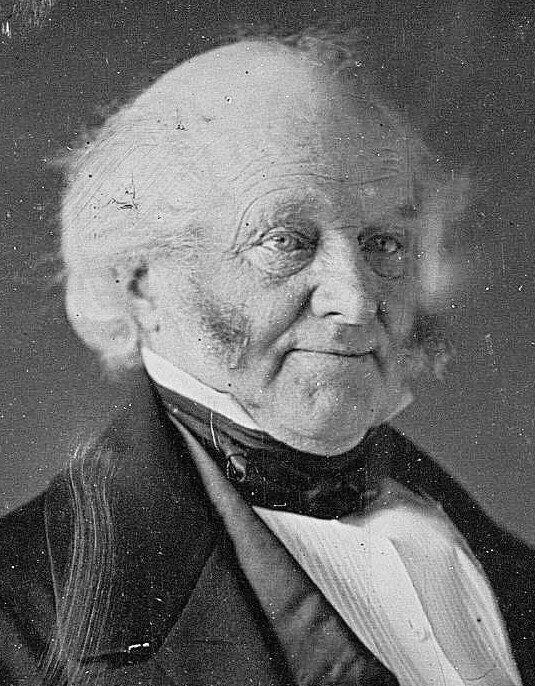

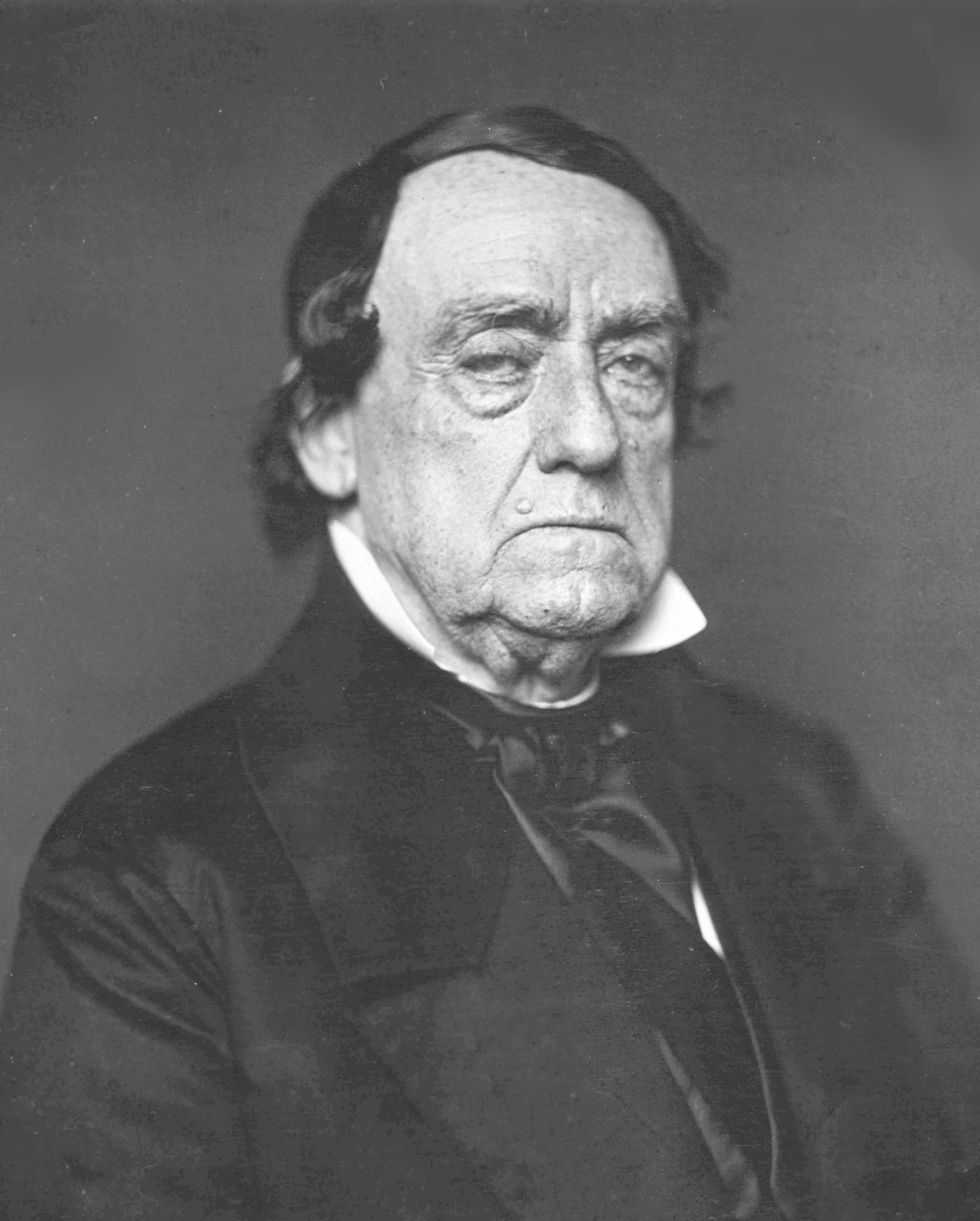
Nominee	Zachary Taylor	Martin Van Buren	Lewis Cass
Party	Whig	Free Soil	Democratic
Home state	Louisiana	New York	Michigan
Running mate	Millard Fillmore	Charles Francis Adams Sr.	William O. Butler
Electoral vote	36	0	0
Popular vote	218,603	120,510	114,320
Percentage	47.94%	26.43%	25.07%
County results
Taylor
30–40%
40–50%
50–60%
Van Buren
30–40%
40–50%
50–60%
Cass
40–50%
President before election
James K. Polk
Democratic
Elected President
Zachary Taylor
Whig

The 1848 United States presidential election in New York took place on November 7, 1848, as part of the 1848 United States presidential election. Voters chose 36 representatives, or electors to the Electoral College, who voted for President and Vice President.

New York voted for the Whig candidate, Zachary Taylor, over Free Soil candidate Martin Van Buren and Democratic candidate Lewis Cass. Taylor won New York by a margin of 21.51% over Van Buren. As of 2024, Van Buren's performance remains the best ever by a third-party candidate in New York presidential election history. With 27% of the popular vote, New York was Van Buren's fourth strongest state after Vermont, Massachusetts and Wisconsin.

This was the first of only five elections to date in which New York City has not backed the Democratic candidate. (Note: The other four elections in which New York City has voted against the Democratic candidate are 1896, 1908, 1920, and 1924.) New York County has only voted against the Democratic candidate three more times since, in 1896, 1920, and 1924.

== Results ==
1848 United States presidential election in New York (Note: Since New York voted for presidential electors directly, the totals below are based on the highest elector on each ticket.)
Party	Candidate	Running mate	Popular vote		Electoral vote	
Party	Candidate	Running mate	Count	%	Count	%
Whig	Zachary Taylor of Louisiana	Millard Fillmore of New York	218,603	47.94%	36	100.00%
Free Soil	Martin Van Buren of New York	Charles Francis Adams Sr. of Massachusetts	120,510	26.43%	0	0.00%
Democratic	Lewis Cass of Michigan	William O. Butler of Kentucky	114,320	25.07%	0	0.00%
Liberty	Gerrit Smith of New York	Charles C. Foote of Michigan	2,545	0.56%	0	0.00%
Total			455,978	100.00%	36	100.00%

=== Results by county ===
County	Zachary Taylor Whig		Martin Van Buren Free Soil		Lewis Cass Democratic		Gerrit Smith Liberty		Margin (Note: Taylor over Van Buren unless otherwise noted)		Total votes cast
County	#	%	#	%	#	%	#	%	#	%	Total votes cast
Albany	7,068	52.31%	2,407	17.82%	4,002	29.62%	34	0.25%	3,066 (Note: Taylor's margin over Cass)	22.69%	13,511
Allegany	2,789	45.33%	2,040	33.15%	1,283	20.85%	41	0.67%	749	12.17%	6,153
Broome	2,490	47.59%	777	14.85%	1,959	37.44%	6	0.11%	531	10.15%	5,232
Cattaraugus	2,604	46.82%	1,236	22.22%	1,677	30.15%	45	0.81%	927	16.67%	5,562
Cayuga	4,318	45.99%	3,979	42.38%	1,034	11.01%	58	0.62%	339	3.61%	9,389
Chautauqua	4,207	54.23%	1,628	20.99%	1,911	24.64%	11	0.14%	2,296	29.60%	7,757
Chemung	1,943	40.17%	2,166	44.78%	728	15.05%	0	0.00%	-223	-4.61%	4,837
Chenango	3,587	46.57%	1,481	19.23%	2,616	33.96%	19	0.25%	971	12.61%	7,703
Clinton	1,941	41.80%	1,221	26.30%	1,472	31.70%	9	0.19%	469	10.10%	4,643
Columbia	3,943	48.27%	2,100	25.71%	2,121	25.96%	5	0.06%	1,822	22.30%	8,169
Cortland	1,879	39.94%	1,803	38.32%	946	20.11%	77	1.64%	76	1.62%	4,705
Delaware	2,832	43.16%	2,908	44.32%	790	12.04%	31	0.47%	-76	-1.16%	6,561
Dutchess	5,376	54.28%	1,295	13.07%	3,227	32.58%	7	0.07%	2,149	21.70%	9,905
Erie	7,647	57.12%	2,357	17.61%	3,360	25.10%	24	0.18%	4,287	32.02%	13,388
Essex	2,629	55.27%	1,119	23.52%	1,002	21.06%	7	0.15%	1,510	31.74%	4,757
Franklin	1,353	41.79%	911	28.13%	974	30.08%	0	0.00%	379	11.70%	3,238
Fulton (Note: Includes Hamilton County)	1,976	49.81%	1,602	40.38%	380	9.58%	9	0.23%	374	9.43%	3,967
Genesee	2,890	55.19%	1,111	21.22%	1,180	22.54%	55	1.05%	1,710	32.66%	5,236
Greene	2,707	42.76%	1,425	22.51%	1,551	24.50%	648	10.24%	1,156	18.26%	6,331
Herkimer	2,430	34.46%	3,893	55.21%	699	9.91%	29	0.41%	-1,463	-20.75%	7,051
Jefferson	4,841	41.48%	4,342	37.20%	2,445	20.95%	43	0.37%	499	4.28%	11,671
Kings	7,511	56.65%	817	6.16%	4,881	36.81%	50	0.38%	2,630	19.84%	13,259
Lewis	1,223	37.25%	1,258	38.32%	789	24.03%	13	0.40%	-35	-1.07%	3,283
Livingston	3,730	55.14%	2,100	31.04%	889	13.14%	46	0.68%	1,630	24.09%	6,765
Madison	2,898	39.05%	2,739	36.91%	1,565	21.09%	219	2.95%	159	2.14%	7,421
Monroe	6,539	51.49%	4,671	36.78%	1,443	11.36%	47	0.37%	1,868	14.71%	12,700
Montgomery	2,924	50.15%	1,602	27.48%	1,285	22.04%	19	0.33%	1,322	22.68%	5,830
New York	29,070	54.53%	5,106	9.58%	18,975	35.59%	159	0.30%	10,095	18.94%	53,310
Niagara	2,828	45.28%	2,080	33.31%	1,313	21.02%	24	0.38%	748	11.98%	6,245
Oneida	6,032	41.50%	4,816	33.13%	3,585	24.66%	103	0.71%	1,216	8.37%	14,536
Onondaga	5,442	43.01%	4,942	39.06%	2,229	17.62%	39	0.31%	500	3.95%	12,652
Ontario	3,848	49.15%	2,627	33.55%	1,272	16.25%	82	1.05%	1,221	15.60%	7,829
Orange	4,172	47.54%	1,434	16.34%	3,170	36.12%	0	0.00%	1,002	11.42%	8,776
Orleans	2,402	47.16%	1,722	33.81%	918	18.02%	51	1.00%	680	13.35%	5,093
Oswego	3,655	39.88%	4,254	46.42%	1,134	12.37%	122	1.33%	-599	-6.54%	9,165
Otsego	3,929	41.00%	1,941	20.26%	3,674	38.34%	38	0.40%	255	2.66%	9,582
Putnam	816	36.66%	415	18.64%	995	44.70%	0	0.00%	-179 (Note: Cass's margin over Taylor)	-8.04%	2,226
Queens	2,444	53.67%	800	17.57%	1,310	28.77%	0	0.00%	1,134	24.90%	4,554
Rensselaer	6,241	52.53%	2,930	24.66%	2,685	22.60%	25	0.21%	3,311	27.87%	11,881
Richmond	1,099	52.79%	123	5.91%	860	41.31%	0	0.00%	239	11.48%	2,082
Rockland	918	40.93%	255	11.37%	1,064	47.44%	6	0.27%	-146	-6.51%	2,243
Saratoga	4,438	52.71%	1,405	16.69%	2,515	29.87%	61	0.72%	1,923	22.84%	8,419
Schenectady	1,716	53.03%	444	13.72%	1,070	33.07%	6	0.19%	646	19.96%	3,236
Schoharie	2,724	44.85%	654	10.77%	2,671	43.97%	25	0.41%	53	0.87%	6,074
Seneca	1,767	37.88%	1,523	32.65%	1,360	29.15%	15	0.32%	244	5.23%	4,665
St. Lawrence	3,667	35.58%	6,023	58.45%	614	5.96%	1	0.01%	-2,356	-22.86%	10,305
Steuben	4,357	43.75%	3,623	36.38%	1,975	19.83%	4	0.04%	734	7.37%	9,959
Suffolk	2,180	46.92%	1,400	30.13%	1,051	22.62%	15	0.32%	780	16.79%	4,646
Sullivan	1,672	46.83%	534	14.96%	1,363	38.18%	1	0.03%	309	8.66%	3,570
Tioga	1,782	41.75%	789	18.49%	1,683	39.43%	14	0.33%	99	2.32%	4,268
Tompkins	3,003	43.32%	2,648	38.20%	1,270	18.32%	11	0.16%	355	5.12%	6,932
Ulster	4,659	52.32%	2,277	25.57%	1,969	22.11%	0	0.00%	2,382	26.75%	8,905
Warren	1,270	42.95%	618	20.90%	1,019	34.46%	50	1.69%	251	8.49%	2,957
Washington	4,486	57.75%	2,024	26.06%	1,225	15.77%	33	0.42%	2,462	31.69%	7,768
Wayne	3,567	44.03%	3,690	45.54%	797	9.84%	48	0.59%	-123	-1.52%	8,102
Westchester	4,112	54.21%	1,312	17.30%	2,146	28.29%	15	0.20%	1,966	25.92%	7,585
Wyoming	2,381	44.30%	1,630	30.33%	1,337	24.87%	27	0.50%	751	13.97%	5,375
Yates	1,651	41.13%	1,483	36.95%	862	21.47%	18	0.45%	168	4.19%	4,014
Total	218,603	47.94%	120,510	26.43%	114,320	25.07%	2,545	0.56%	98,093	21.51%	455,978

==== Counties that flipped from Democratic to Whig ====
- Cayuga
- Chenango
- Clinton
- Columbia
- Fulton
- Greene
- Jefferson
- Madison
- Montgomery
- New York
- Oneida
- Onondaga
- Orange
- Otsego
- Queens
- Richmond
- Schoharie
- Seneca
- Steuben
- Suffolk
- Sullivan
- Tioga
- Tompkins
- Warren
- Westchester
- Yates

==== Counties that flipped from Democratic to Free Soil ====
- Chemung
- Delaware
- Herkimer
- Lewis
- Oswego
- St. Lawrence
- Wayne

== See also ==
- United States presidential elections in New York
