= 1848 United States presidential election in New Hampshire =

- November 7, 1848
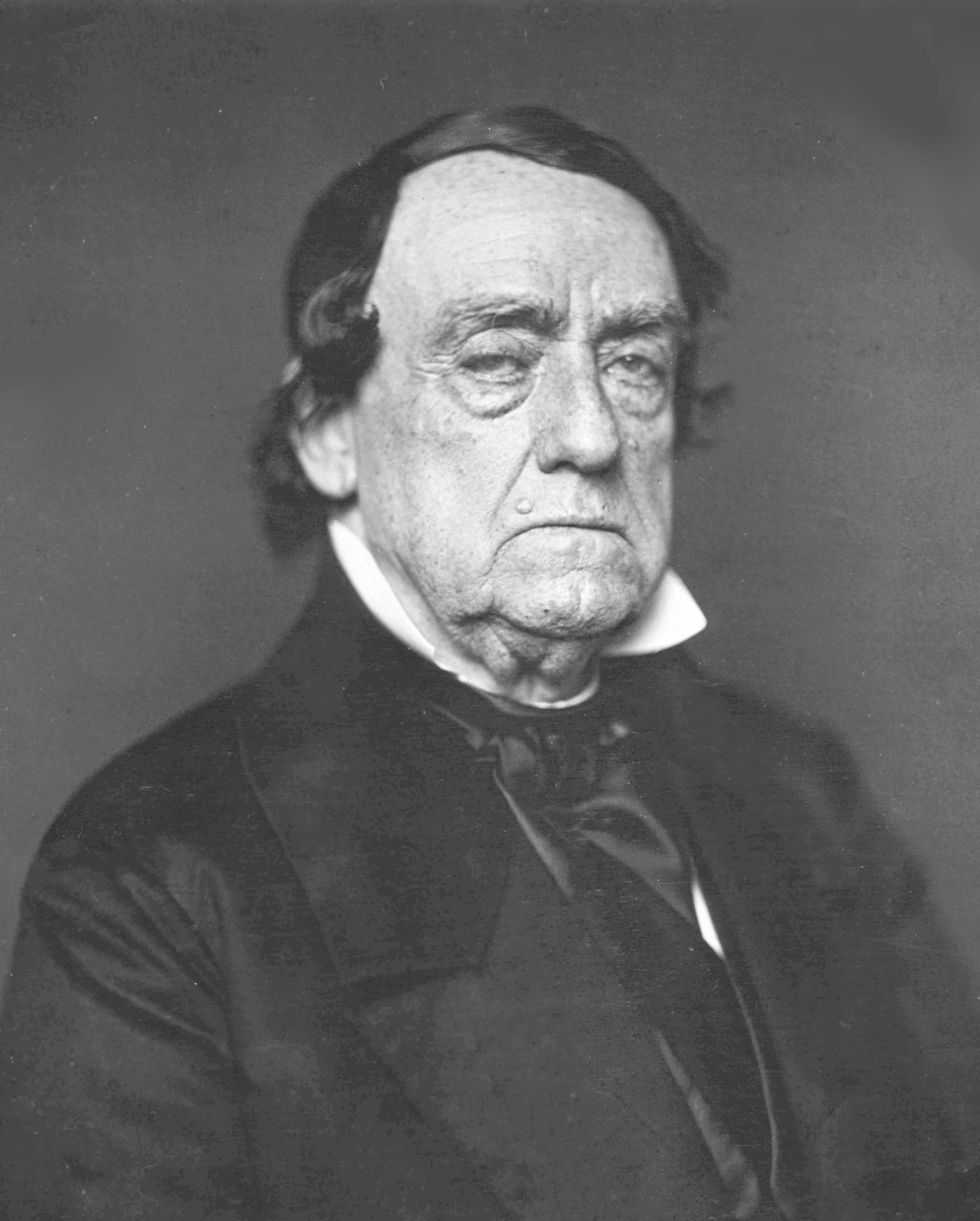

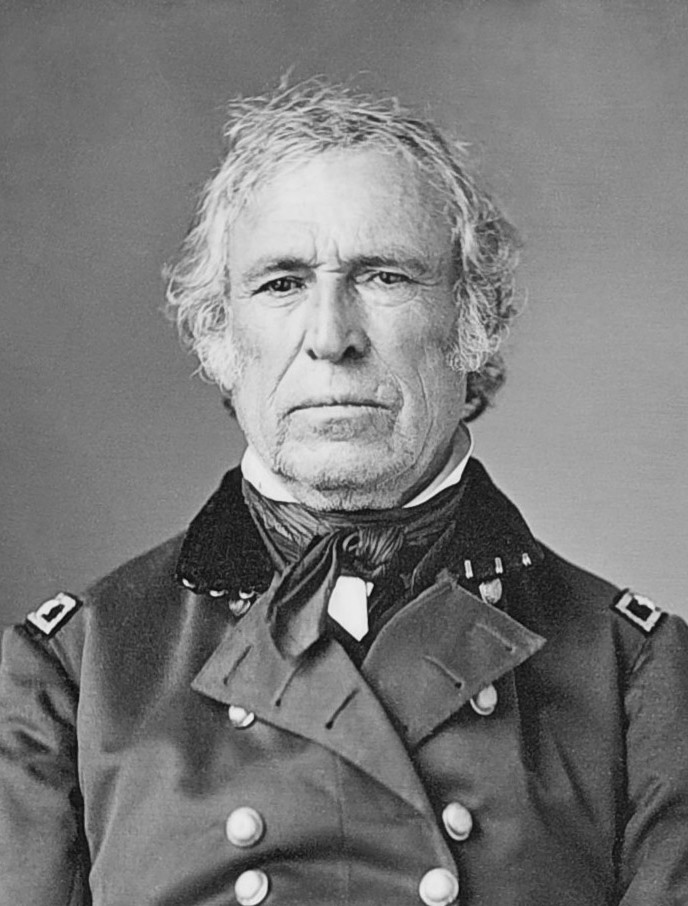

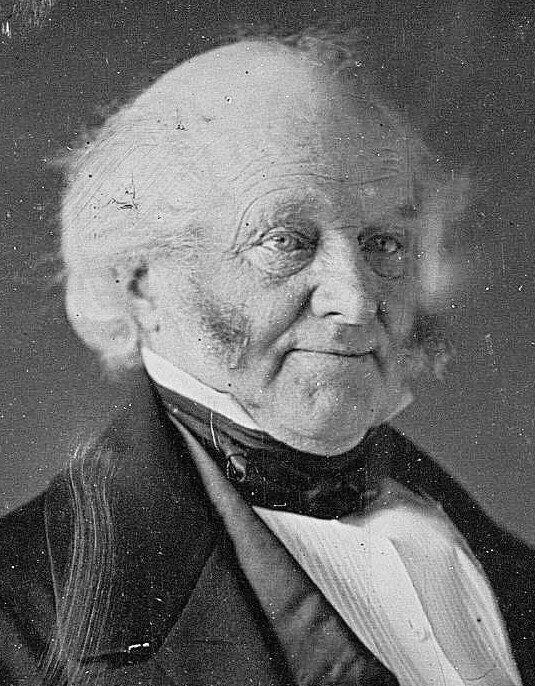
Nominee	Lewis Cass	Zachary Taylor	Martin Van Buren
Party	Democratic	Whig	Free Soil
Home state	Michigan	Louisiana	New York
Running mate	William O. Butler	Millard Fillmore	Charles Francis Adams Sr.
Electoral vote	6	0	0
Popular vote	27,763	14,781	7,560
Percentage	55.41%	29.50%	15.09%
County results
Cass
40–50%
50–60%
60–70%
70–80%
President before election
James K. Polk
Democratic
Elected President
Zachary Taylor
Whig

The 1848 United States presidential election in New Hampshire took place on November 7, 1848, as part of the 1848 United States presidential election. Voters chose six representatives, or electors to the Electoral College, who voted for President and Vice President.

New Hampshire voted for the Democratic candidate, Lewis Cass, over Whig candidate Zachary Taylor and Free Soil candidate former president Martin Van Buren. Cass won the state by a margin of 25.91%. This was the last time until 2004 that a Democrat carried New Hampshire without winning the presidency.

== Results ==
1848 United States presidential election in New Hampshire
Party	Candidate	Running mate	Popular vote		Electoral vote	
Party	Candidate	Running mate	Count	%	Count	%
Democratic	Lewis Cass of Michigan	William O. Butler of Kentucky	27,763	55.41%	6	100.00%
Whig	Zachary Taylor of Louisiana	Millard Fillmore of New York	14,781	29.50%	0	0.00%
Free Soil	Martin Van Buren of New York	Charles Francis Adams Sr. of Massachusetts	7,560	15.09%	0	0.00%
Total			50,104	100.00%	6	100.00%

== See also ==
- United States presidential elections in New Hampshire
