= Charles C. Foote =

American minister and activist

Rev. Charles C. Foote (March 30, 1811 – May 3, 1891) was an American Presbyterian minister, abolitionist and temperance activist. He was the vice-presidential nominee of the Liberty Party in the 1848 election alongside Gerritt Smith. The Liberty Party was an abolitionist political party which later merged with the Free Soil Party.

Foote was born in 1811 in Olean, New York, and moved to Milford, Michigan, in 1834. He graduated from Oberlin College in 1840. He was ordained a Presbyterian minister and married Clarissa Clark in that same year. He spent the next two years studying medicine at Fairfield Medical School with a desire for foreign missionary work. Instead of going abroad, Foote served as a pastor in churches in upstate New York and Michigan. In 1848, he was chosen as the Liberty Party's vice-presidential nominee on the 2nd ballot of their national convention. The ticket would come in fourth place in the election, carrying 2,545 popular votes, all from New York.

In 1854, Foote moved to Detroit, Michigan, and served as a traveling fundraising agent of the Refugee Home Society, which purchased land for former slaves in Ontario, where slavery was outlawed. He stayed in this position until the American Civil War ended and slavery was outlawed, at which time Foote became an agent in the Freedmen's Aid Society. In 1882, Foote ran for Governor of Michigan as the American Party nominee. The American Party was a political party which demanded recognition of the Sabbath, the introduction of the Bible into public schools, alcohol prohibition, the restriction of land monopolies and resumption of specie payment. He was also an active member of the Prohibition Party from its founding in 1869 until his death in 1891.

Foote's first wife, Clarissa, died in 1857 and was buried in White Lake, Michigan. He married Hannah Merritt a year later. Foote died on May 3, 1891, at the age of 80 and was also buried in White Lake.
