= 1848 United States presidential election in Delaware =

- November 7, 1848
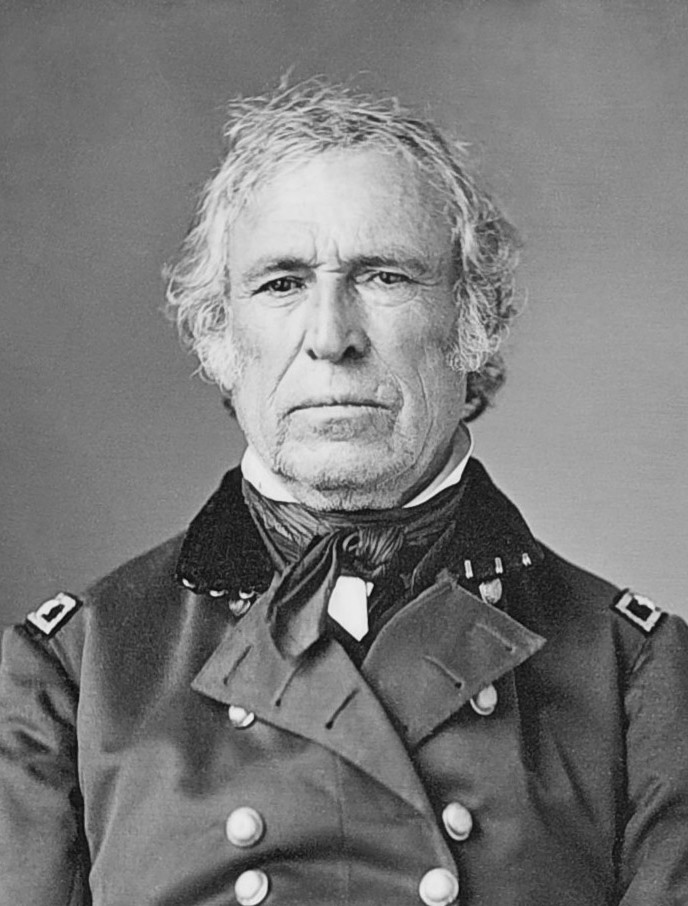

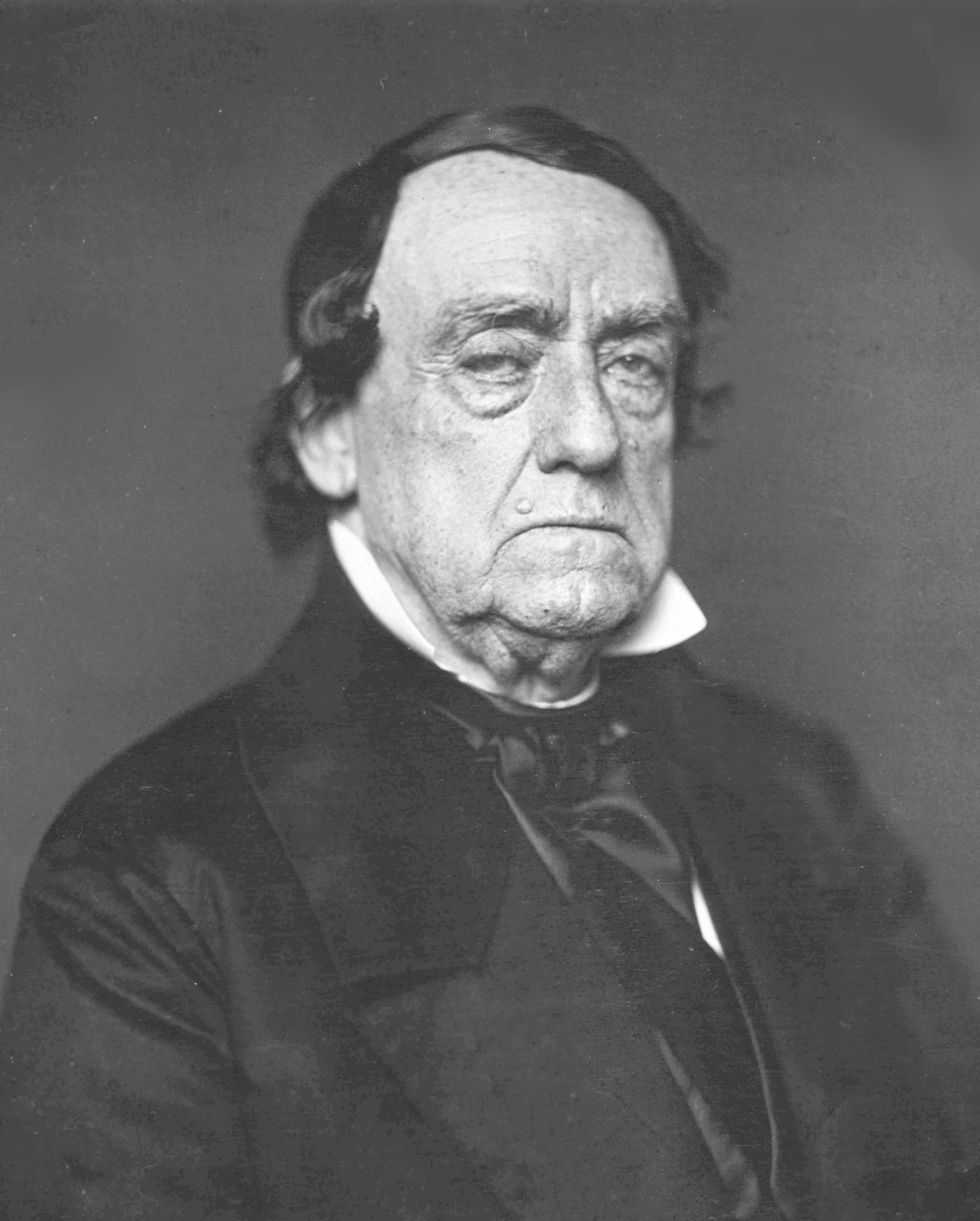
Nominee	Zachary Taylor	Lewis Cass
Party	Whig	Democratic
Home state	Louisiana	Michigan
Running mate	Millard Fillmore	William O. Butler
Electoral vote	3	0
Popular vote	6,440	5,910
Percentage	51.80%	47.54%
County results
Taylor
50–60%
Cass
50–60%
President before election
James K. Polk
Democratic
Elected President
Zachary Taylor
Whig

The 1848 United States presidential election in Delaware took place on November 7, 1848, as part of the 1848 United States presidential election. Voters chose three representatives, or electors to the Electoral College, who voted for President and Vice President.

Delaware voted for the Whig candidate, Zachary Taylor, over Democratic candidate Lewis Cass. Taylor won the state by a narrow margin of 4.26%.

== Results ==
General Election Results
Party	Pledged to	Elector	Votes
Whig Party	Zachary Taylor	Gardiner H. Wright	6,440
Whig Party	Zachary Taylor	Samuel Catts	6,422
Whig Party	Zachary Taylor	Philip Reybold	6,422
Democratic Party	Lewis Cass	John Dilworth	5,910
Democratic Party	Lewis Cass	Caleb H. Sipple	5,904
Democratic Party	Lewis Cass	George Hickman	5,899
Free Soil Party	Martin Van Buren	Alexander H. Dixon	80
Free Soil Party	Martin Van Buren	Jeremiah W. Duncan	80
Free Soil Party	Martin Van Buren	Joseph Lindsey	78
Write-in		Scattering	2
Votes cast (Note: Based on highest elector on each ticket)			12,432

=== Results by county ===
County	Zachary Taylor Whig		Lewis Cass Democratic		Martin Van Buren Free Soil		Margin		Total votes cast
County	#	%	#	%	#	%	#	%	Total votes cast
Kent	1,497	52.79%	1,337	47.14%	1	0.04%	160	5.64%	2,836 (Note: Includes 1 Scattering vote)
New Castle	3,091	52.50%	2,717	46.14%	79	1.34%	374	6.35%	5,888
Sussex	1,852	49.95%	1,856	50.05%	0	0.00%	-4	-0.11%	3,708
Totals	6,440	51.80%	5,910	47.54%	80	0.64%	530	4.26%	12,432

== See also ==
- United States presidential elections in Delaware
