= 1848 United States presidential election =

Election of Zachary Taylor

- November 7, 1848

290 members of the Electoral College 146 electoral votes needed to win
- Turnout: 72.8% (▼6.4 pp)
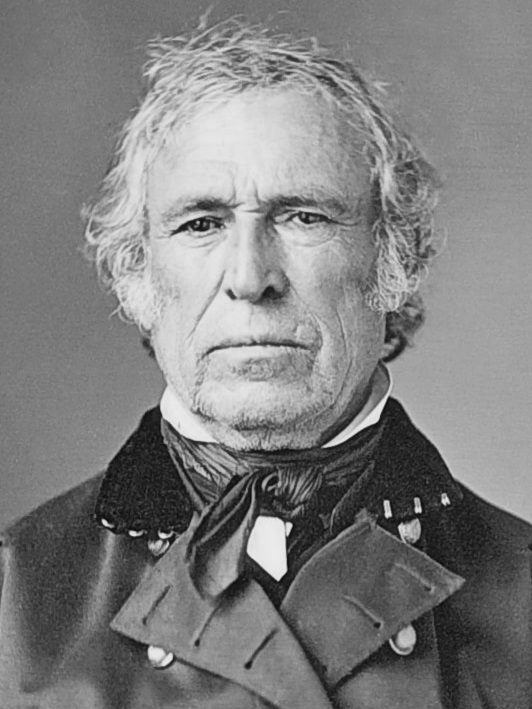

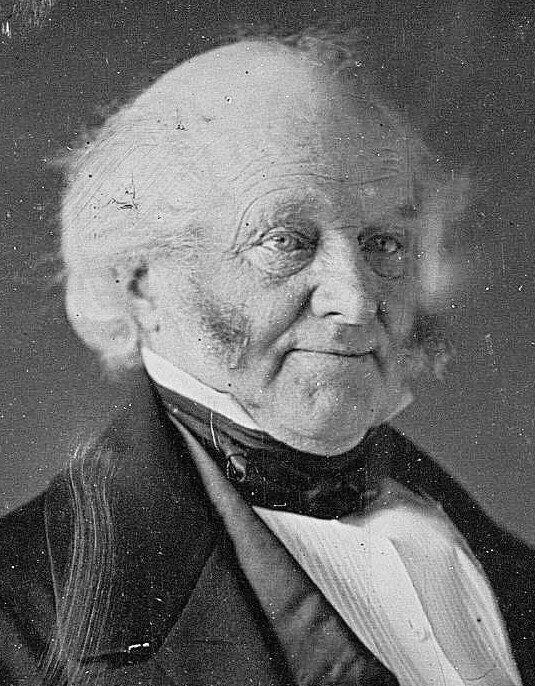
| Nominee | Zachary Taylor | Lewis Cass | Martin Van Buren |
| Party | Whig | Democratic | Free Soil |
| Alliance | Native American |
| Home state | Louisiana | Michigan | New York |
| Running mate | Millard Fillmore | William O. Butler | Charles Francis Adams Sr. |
| Electoral vote | 163 | 127 | 0 |
| States carried | 15 | 15 | 0 |
| Popular vote | 1,361,396 | 1,223,460 | 291,501 |
| Percentage | 47.3% | 42.5% | 10.1% |
- Presidential election results map. Buff denotes states won by Taylor/Fillmore and Blue by Cass/Butler. Numbers indicate the number of electoral votes cast by each state.
President before election
James K. Polk
Democratic
Elected President
Zachary Taylor
Whig

A presidential election was held in the United States on November 7, 1848 in the aftermath of the Mexican–American War. General Zachary Taylor of the Whig Party defeated Senator Lewis Cass of the Democratic Party.

Despite his unclear political alignment and Whig opposition to the Mexican–American War in which Taylor had led American forces to victory, the 1848 Whig National Convention nominated the popular general over party stalwarts Henry Clay and Daniel Webster. For vice president, the Whigs nominated Millard Fillmore from New York, known for moderate views on slavery. Incumbent President James K. Polk, a Democrat, as he promised in his inaugural address, refused to seek re-election. The 1848 Democratic National Convention nominated Senator Lewis Cass of Michigan after former President Martin Van Buren withdrew his bid for a third and nonconsecutive nomination over a platform dispute. Van Buren, from New York, instead broke from the Democratic Party to win the nomination of the Free Soil Party, which opposed the extension of slavery into the territories.

The Democrats had a record of prosperity and had acquired vast lands including Texas, the Mexican Cession, and the southern portion of the Oregon Country. They appeared certain to win unless the Whigs masked their prior opposition to the successful war by nominating Taylor. Taylor won a popular plurality and an electoral majority, while Van Buren won 10.1% of the popular vote, a strong showing for a third party candidate.

Taylor was the second and final member of the Whig Party to win a Presidential election, following fellow general William Henry Harrison's victory in 1840. Like Harrison, Taylor died in office, and was succeeded by Fillmore. The Whig Party would later permanently disband after the 1856 Election. Notably this was the last presidential election in which a native southerner won until Democrat Woodrow Wilson was elected in 1912.

== Nominations ==
=== Whig Party nomination ===
1848 Whig Party ticket
| Zachary Taylor | Millard Fillmore |
| for President | for Vice President |
| Major general of the United States Army (1846–1849) | 14th New York State Comptroller (1848–1849) |

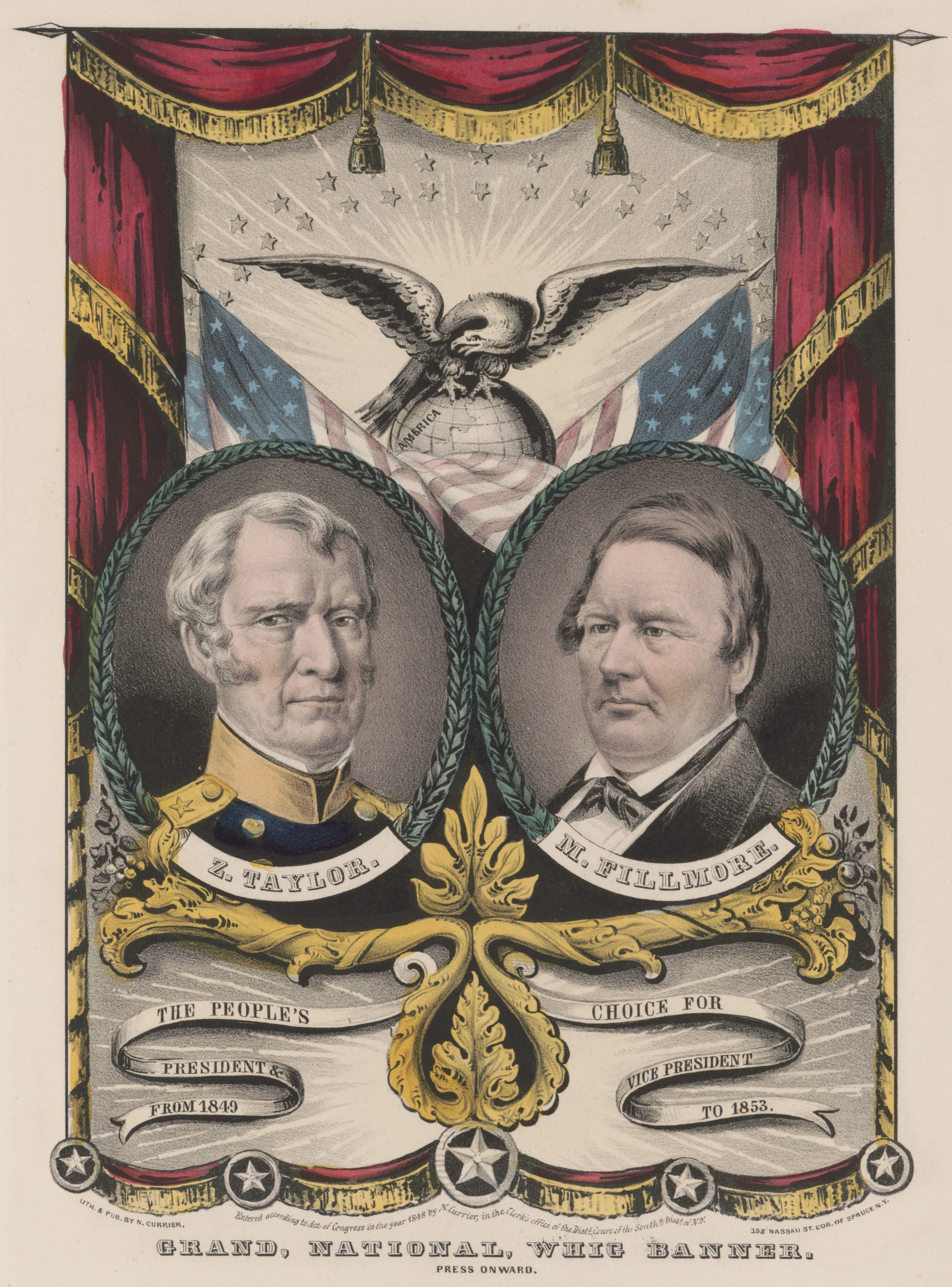
Grand, National, Whig Banner

The Whig Party held its national convention in Philadelphia, Pennsylvania, with delegates from every state except for Texas although the Texas Whigs had selected to make the Louisiana delegates their proxies. Henry Clay, Winfield Scott, Zachary Taylor, and Daniel Webster sought the presidential nomination and Taylor led on every ballot before winning on the fourth ballot. After Webster turned down the vice presidential candidacy, Millard Fillmore received the party's vice-presidential nomination on the second ballot after defeating Abbott Lawrence, a Massachusetts politician whose mild opposition to slavery led him to be dubbed a "Cotton Whig". An attempt was made to make both nominations unanimous, but it was unsuccessful due to Taylor's support for the Whig Party being seen as dubious.

=== Democratic Party nomination ===
1848 Democratic Party ticket
| Lewis Cass | William O. Butler |
| for President | for Vice President |
| U.S. Senator from Michigan (1845–1848) | U.S. Representative for Kentucky's 13th (1839–1843) |

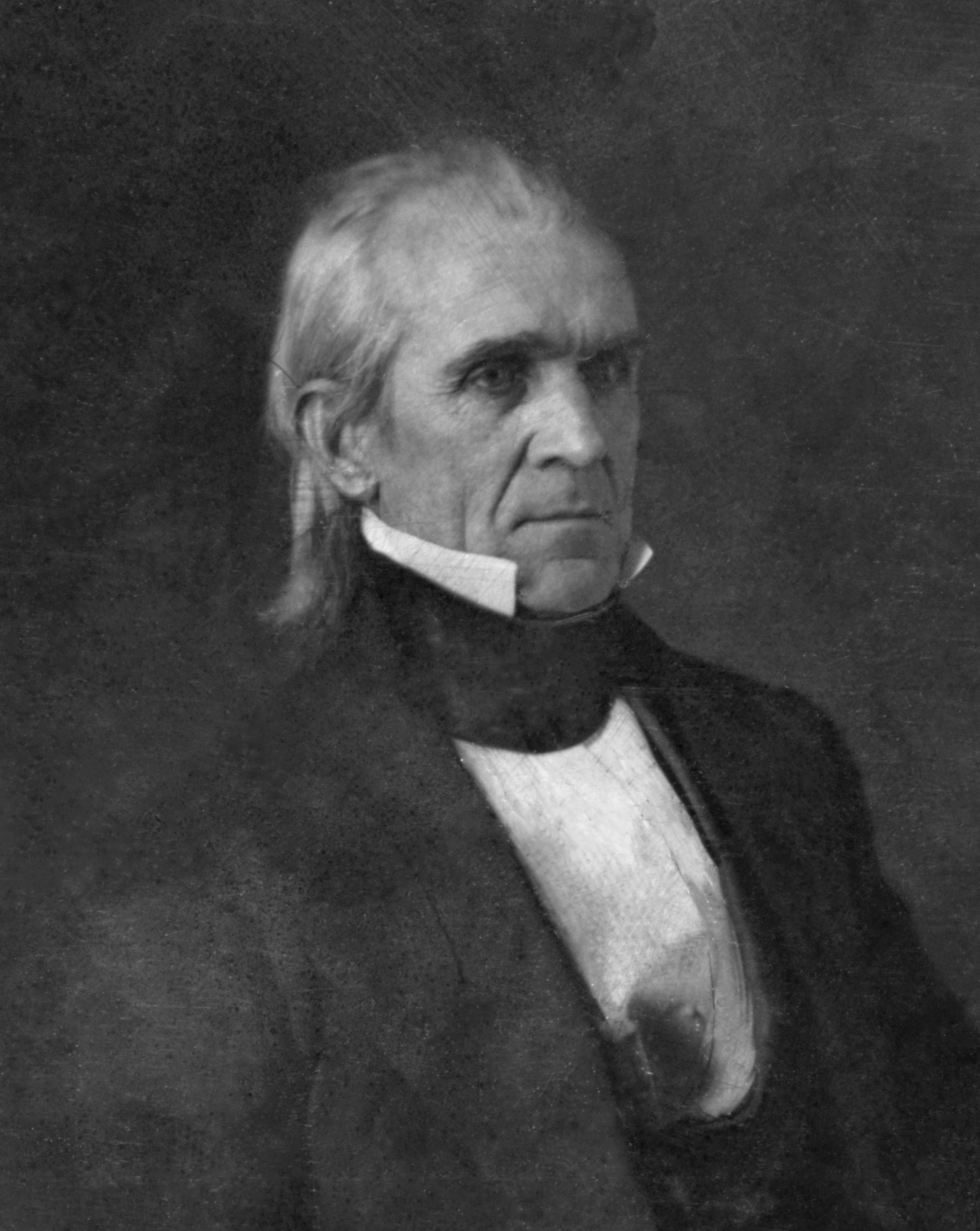
James K. Polk, the incumbent president in 1848, whose term expired on March 4, 1849

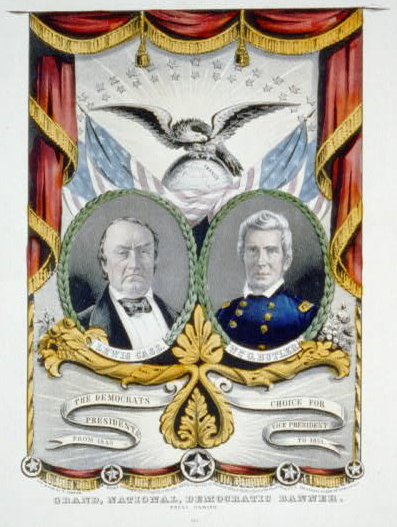
Cass/Butler campaign poster

The Democratic Party held its national convention in Baltimore, Maryland. There was a credentials dispute over the New York delegation between the Barnburners and Hunkers factions with the Barnburners being anti-slavery. The delegates voted 126 to 125 to seat both delegations and share their control of New York's votes, but the Barnburners left the convention in disagreement with the compromise while the Hunkers refused to vote. The withdrawal of the Barnburners effectively removed former President Martin Van Buren, who had already become unenthusiastic about trying to win the party's nomination after the convention had voted to endorse a platform supporting popular sovereignty, from contention.

As a result of Van Buren's withdrawal, U.S. Senator Lewis Cass and Secretary of State James Buchanan were seen as the only serious contenders for the presidential nomination, with a draft effort also focusing on Supreme Court associate justice Levi Woodbury. In stark contrast to the highly contested and protracted convention at the previous election, Cass held a wide lead on all four ballots, only being denied victory on the third due to the convention rules requiring a two-thirds majority, before the Buchanan and Woodbury campaigns quietly released enough delegates to allow Cass victory on the fourth ballot. William Orlando Butler won the vice-presidential nomination on the second ballot against John A. Quitman.

=== Free Soil Party nomination ===
1848 Free Soil Party ticket
| Martin Van Buren | Charles Francis Adams Sr. |
| for President | for Vice President |
| 8th President of the United States (1837–1841) | Massachusetts State Senator (1844–1845) |

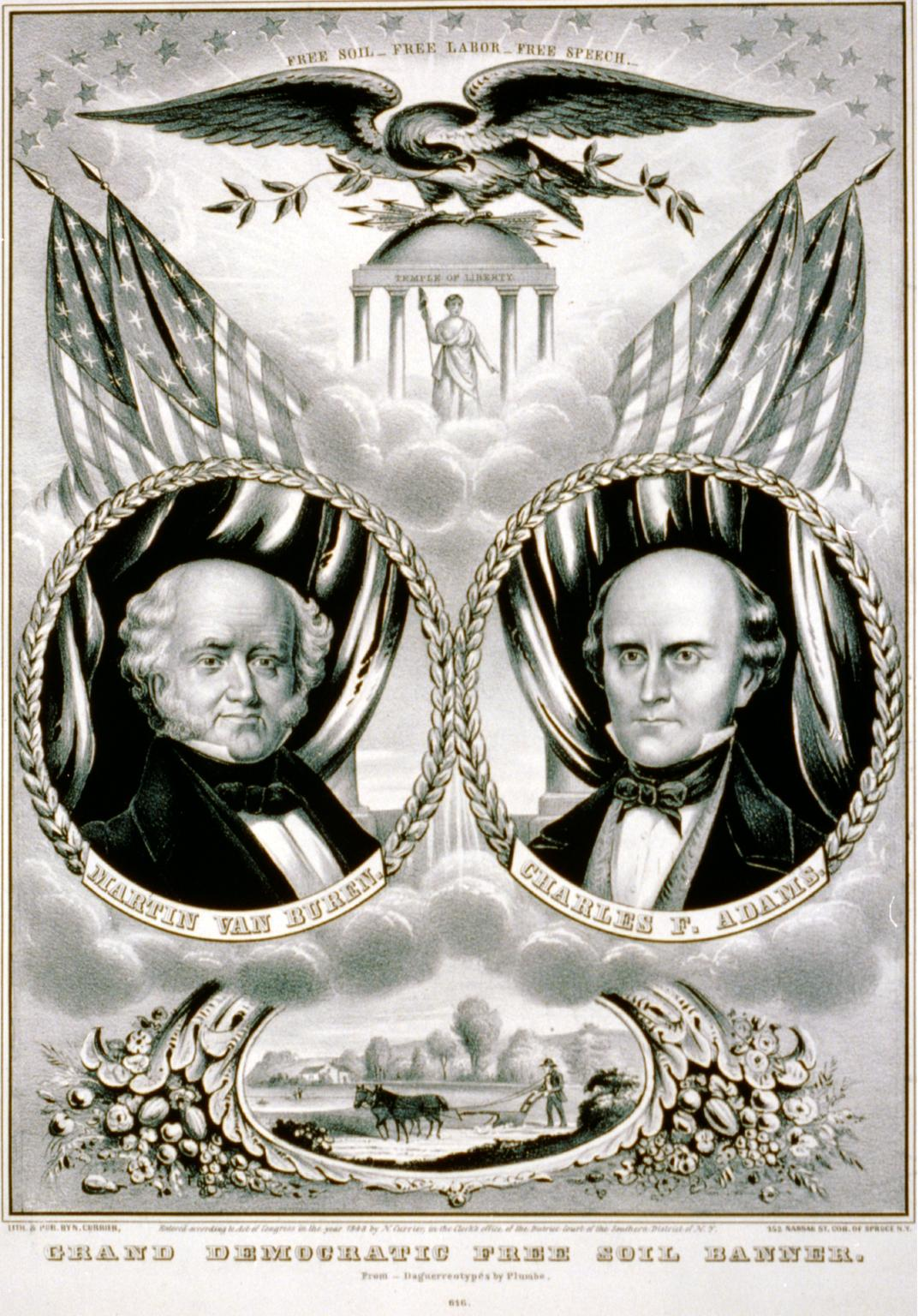
Van Buren/Adams

Members of the Whig Party who opposed slavery, New York Barnburners, and members of the Liberty Party met in August 1848 in Buffalo, New York, to found a new political party. The Barnburners made a call for the formation of an anti-slavery party at their conclave in June, and by the People's Convention of Friends of Free Territory, which was organized by Salmon P. Chase, in Columbus, Ohio. The convention was attended by 165 delegates from eight states to form the Free Soil Party.

Van Buren won the party's presidential nomination against John P. Hale on the first ballot with 244 votes against Hale's 181 votes. Hale had been nominated by the Liberty Party in October 1847, but withdrew from the election after the Free Soil Party gave its presidential nomination to Van Buren. Charles Francis Adams Sr. won the party's vice-presidential nomination.

Van Buren knew that the Free Soilers had not the slightest chance of winning, rather that his candidacy would split the Democratic vote and throw the election to the Whigs. Bitter and aging, Van Buren did not care despite the fact that his life had been built upon the rock of party solidarity and party regularity. He loathed Lewis Cass and the principle of popular sovereignty with equal intensity.

=== Liberty Party nomination ===
1848 Liberty Party ticket
| Gerrit Smith | Charles C. Foote |
| for President | for Vice President |
| Philanthropist from New York | Minister from Michigan |

Despite their significant showing in the prior presidential election, certain events would conspire to remove the Liberty Party from political significance.

Initially, the party's presidential nomination was to be decided in the fall of 1847 at a Convention in Buffalo, New York. There, Senator John P. Hale was nominated for president over Gerrit Smith, brother-in-law to the party's previous presidential nominee James G. Birney. Leicester King, a former judge and state senator in Ohio, was nominated for vice president. Anti-slavery Democrats and Whigs, disappointed with their respective nominees, would form a new movement in conjunction with members of the Liberty Party such as John Hale and Salmon Chase to form the Free Soil Party that summer. At this point, both Hale and King withdrew in favor of a Free Soil ticket led by former President Martin Van Buren, and the great majority of members of the Liberty Party followed them into the new political party.

A small faction refused to support Van Buren for the presidency, however. They held another convention in June 1848 as the "National Liberty Party." Gerrit Smith was nominated for president with Charles C. Foote, a Presbyterian minister from Michigan, as his vice presidential running mate.

Convention vote
| Presidential vote | | Vice presidential vote | |
|---|---|---|---|
| Gerrit Smith | 99 | Charles C. Foote | 44 |
| Beriah Green | 2 | George Bradburn | 12 |
| Frederick Douglass | 1 | Samuel Ringgold Ward | 12 |
| Charles C. Foote | 1 | Lucretia Mott | 5 |
| Amos A. Sampson | 1 | John Curtis | 3 |
| | | Beriah Green | 3 |
| | | Charles O. Shepard | 3 |
| | | Frederick Douglass | 1 |
| | | Edward Smith | 1 |

=== Other nominations ===
The Native American Party, a precursor to the Know Nothings, which had split from the Whig Party in 1845, met in September 1847 in Philadelphia, where they nominated Zachary Taylor for president and Henry A. S. Dearborn of Massachusetts for vice president. However, when the Whig Party nominated Taylor for the presidency with Millard Fillmore as his running mate the following year, this rendered his previous nomination moot and the Native American Party failed to make an alternate nomination.

The 3rd National Industrial Congress took place at Philadelphia on June 7, 1848. The gathering was attended by delegates of the National Reform Association, as well as by representatives of other socialist and radical groups, including the Fourierist American Union of Associationists, the German-American Social Reform Association, and veterans of the Dorrite, Owenite, and Chartist movements. The delegates nominated Gerrit Smith for president and William S. Waite for vice president; the platform paired the NRA's signature issue, land reform, with resolutions endorsing consumer cooperatives, direct democracy, labor rights, and opposing federal subsidies to fund the transcontinental railroad. Waite subsequently declined the vice-presidential nomination and was replaced on the ticket by Charles C. Foote.

== General election ==
=== Campaign ===
The campaign was fought without much enthusiasm, and practically without an issue. Neither of the two great parties made an effort to rally the people to the defense of any important principle.

Whig campaigners, who included future presidents Abraham Lincoln and Rutherford B. Hayes, talked up Taylor's "antiparty" opposition to the Jacksonian commitment to the spoils system and yellow-dog partisanship. In the South, they stressed that he was a Louisiana slaveholder, while in the North they highlighted his Whiggish willingness to defer to Congress on major issues (which he subsequently did not do).

Democrats repeated, as they had for many years, their opposition to a national bank, high tariffs, and federal subsidies for local improvements. The Free Soilers branded both major parties lackeys of the Slave Power, arguing that the rich planters controlled the agenda of both parties, leaving the ordinary white man out of the picture. They had to work around Van Buren's well-known reputation for compromising with slavery.

The Whigs had the advantage of highlighting Taylor's military glories. With Taylor remaining vague on the issues, the campaign was dominated by personalities and personal attacks, with the Democrats calling Taylor vulgar, uneducated, cruel and greedy, and the Whigs attacking Cass for graft and dishonesty. The division of the Democrats over slavery allowed Taylor to dominate the Northeast.

The Free Soilers were on the ballots in only 17 of the 29 states with the popular vote, making it mathematically possible for Van Buren to win the presidency, but he had no real chance. Still, the party campaigned vigorously, particularly in the traditional Democratic strongholds in the northeast.

While some Free Soilers were hopeful of taking enough states to throw the election into the House of Representatives, Van Buren himself knew this was a long shot and that the best that his party could do was lay the groundwork for a hopefully improved showing in 1852.

==== 1848 campaign artwork ====
Artwork for "Fort Harrison March," a campaign song for Zachary Taylor's presidential campaign which recalled his triumph at the Siege of Fort Harrison in 1812.

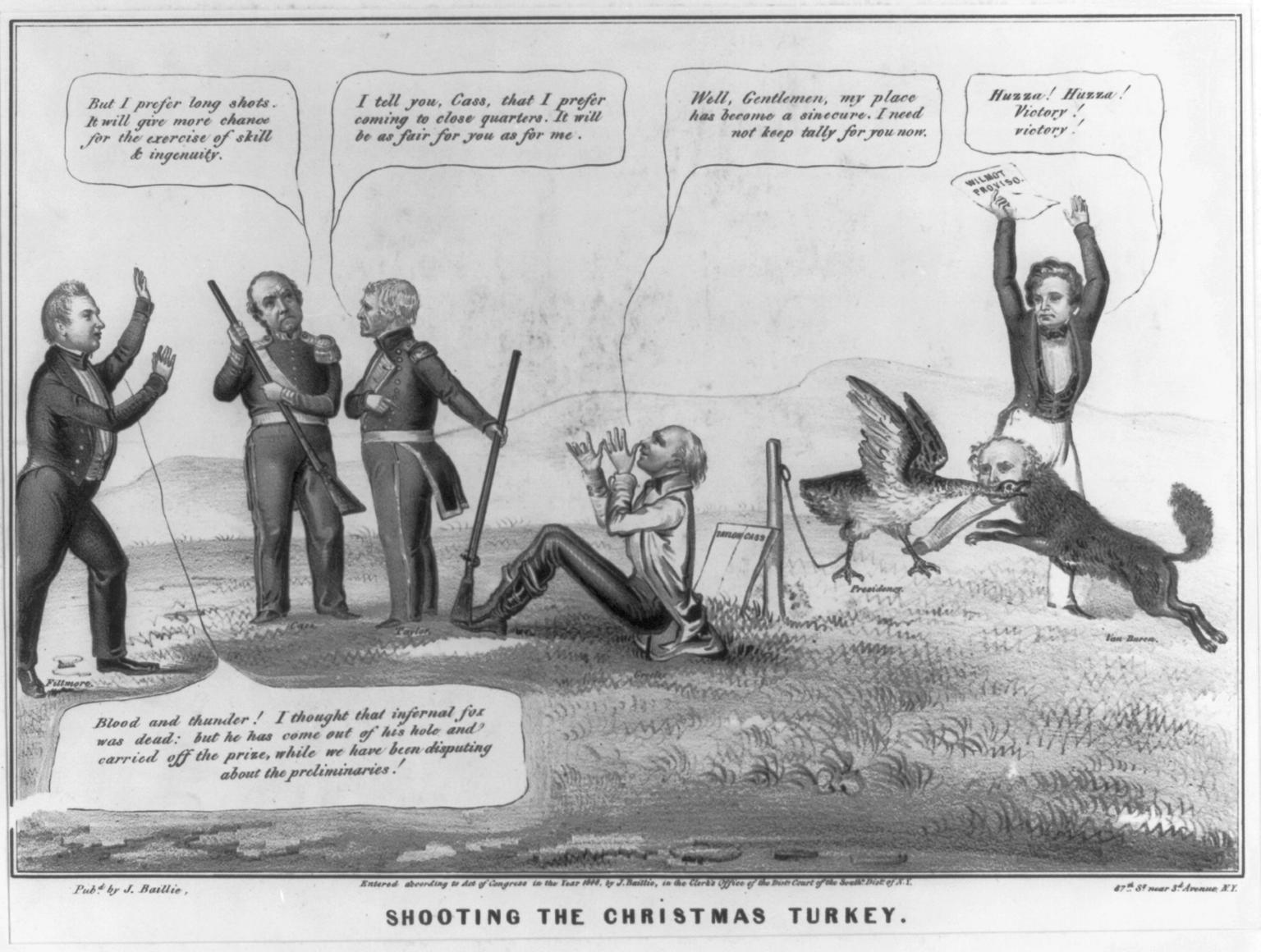
Political cartoon about the election campaign, titled "Shooting the Christmas Turkey"

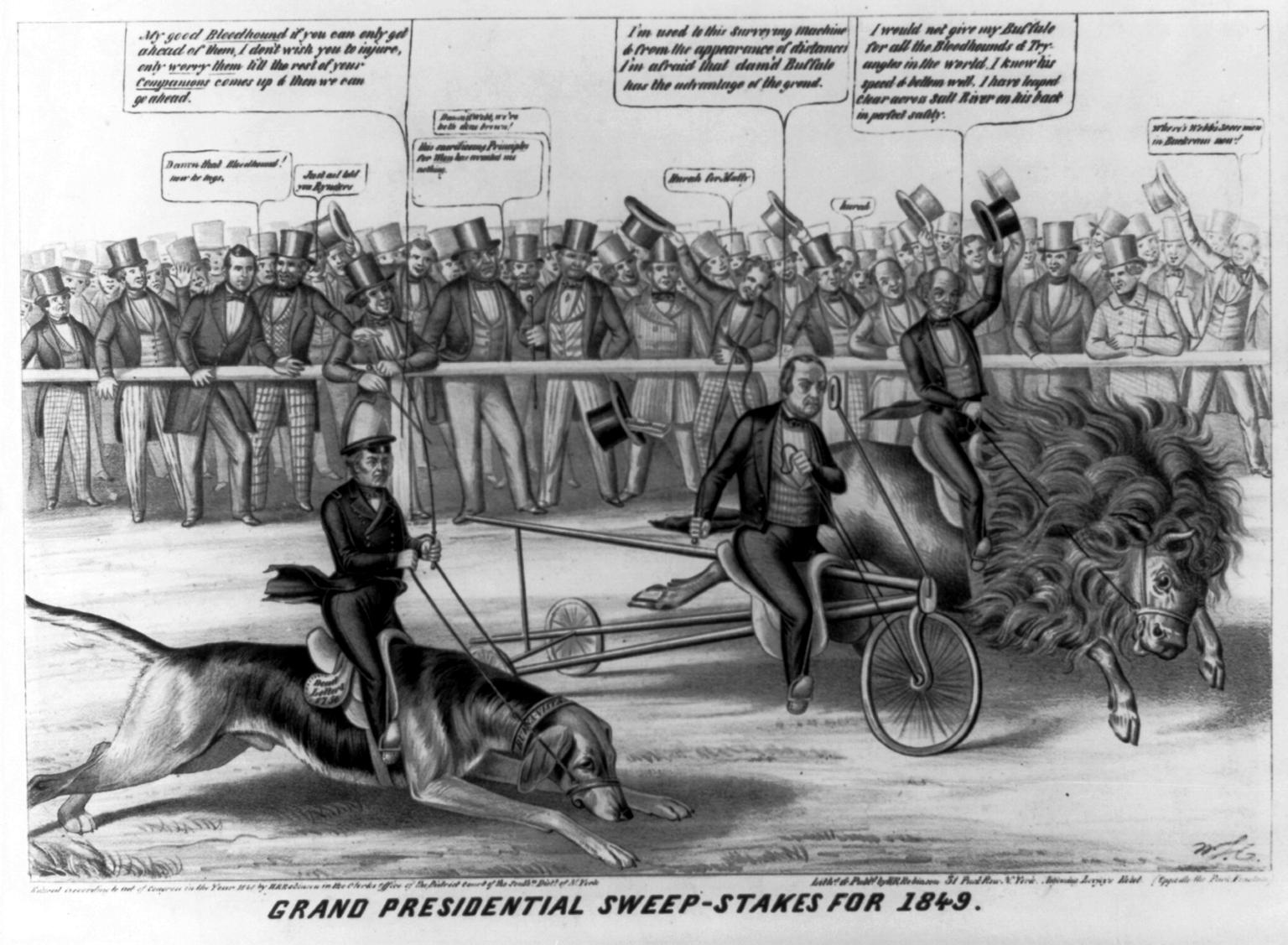
"Grand Presidential sweep-stakes" - political cartoon of the three main candidates

=== Records ===
This was the first time in the Second Party System in which the victorious party failed to gain at least a plurality of the counties as well as of the popular vote.

This was the last election in which Connecticut, Delaware, Florida, Georgia, Louisiana, Maryland, New Jersey, New York, North Carolina, Pennsylvania, and Rhode Island voted for the Whigs. It was also the last time that Georgia voted against the Democrats until 1964, the last time Delaware and Louisiana did so until 1872, and the last time Florida and North Carolina did so until 1868.

Discounting Republican Abraham Lincoln's 1864 re-election on the National Union ticket, Taylor is the most recent individual who was not a member of either the Democratic Party or the Republican Party to win a presidential election. The contest was the first presidential election that took place on the same day in every state, and it was the first time that Election Day was statutorily a Tuesday. It is also the first election in which the two candidates that received electoral votes carried the same number of states and the only time that it happened between Democrat and Whig candidates. This would only happen again twice, in 1880 and 2020.

=== Results ===
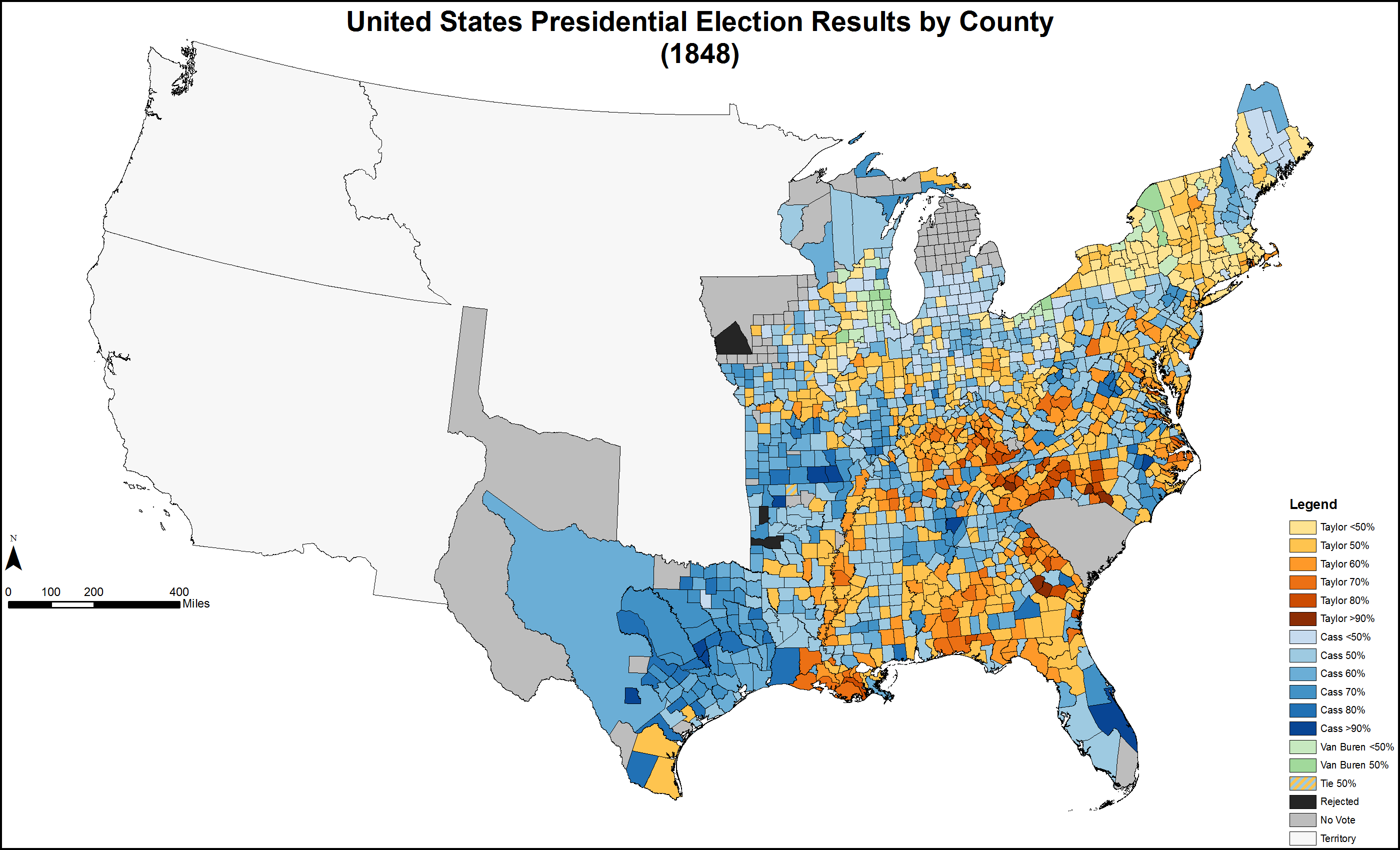
Results by county explicitly indicating the percentage of the winning candidate in each county. Shades of yellow are for Taylor (Whig), shades of blue are for Cass (Democrat), and shades of green are for Van Buren (Free Soil).

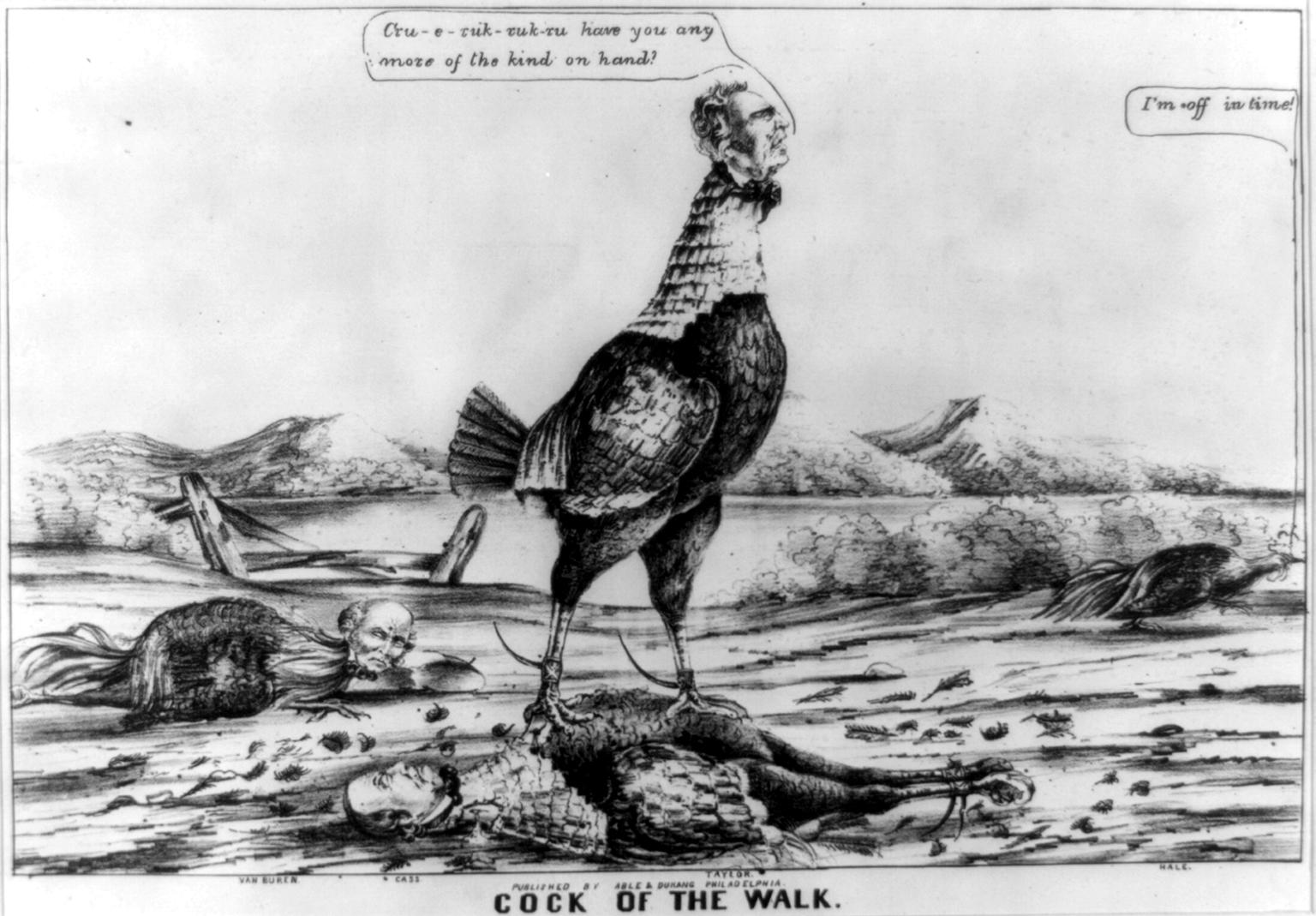
"Cock of the walk" - Zachary Taylor as victor

28.6% of the voting age population and 72.8% of eligible voters participated in the election. With Taylor as their candidate, the Whigs won their second and last victory in a presidential election. Taylor won the electoral college by capturing 163 of the 290 electoral votes. Taylor out-polled Cass in the popular vote by 138,000 votes, winning 47% of the popular vote, and was elected president.

A shift of less than 6,000 votes to Cass in Georgia and Maryland would have left the electoral college in a 145–145 tie, while a shift of less than 27,000 votes to Van Buren in Connecticut, Maine and Massachusetts would have left both Taylor and Cass short of the 146 electoral votes required to win, forcing a contingent election in the House of Representatives.

A study of the county returns reveals that Free Soil strength drawn at the expense of the major parties differed by region. In the East North Central States, it appears at least the majority of the Free Soil strength was drawn from the Whig Party.

Conversely, in the Middle Atlantic region, Free Soil bases of strength lay in the areas which had hitherto been Democratic, particularly in New York and northern Pennsylvania. The Free Soil Democrats nomination of Van Buren made the victory of Taylor nearly certain in New York. On election day, enough Democratic votes were drawn away by Van Buren to give the Whig ticket all but two Democratic counties, thus enabling it to carry hitherto impregnable parts of upper New York state. The Democrats, confronted with an irreparable schism in New York, lost the election.

In New England, the Democratic vote declined by 33,000 from its 1844 level, while the Whig vote likewise declined by 15,000 votes. The third-party vote tripled, and the total vote remained nearly stationary: a partial indication, perhaps, of the derivation of the Free Soil strength in this section. For the first time since the existence of the Whig Party, the Whigs failed to gain an absolute majority of the vote in Massachusetts and Vermont. In addition, the Democrats failed to retain their usual majority in Maine; thus only New Hampshire (Democratic) and Rhode Island (Whig) of the states in this section gave their respective victorious parties clear-cut majorities.

Of the 1,464 counties/independent cities making returns, Cass placed first in 753 (51.43%), Taylor in 676 (46.17%), and Van Buren in 31 (2.12%). Four counties (0.27%) in the West split evenly between Taylor and Cass.

The election has sometimes been described as "a contest without an issue," as both major candidates sought to steer clear of divisive subjects. The historian George Pierce Garrison famously quipped that "practically the only thing it decided was that a Whig general should be made President because he had done effective work in carrying on a Democratic war."

Electoral results
| Presidential candidate | Party | Home state | Popular vote^{(a)} | | Electoral vote | Running mate | | |
| Presidential candidate | Party | Home state | Count | Percentage | Electoral vote | Vice-presidential candidate | Home state | Electoral vote |
|---|---|---|---|---|---|---|---|---|
| Zachary Taylor | Whig | Louisiana | 1,361,393 | 47.28% | 163 | Millard Fillmore | New York | 163 |
| Lewis Cass | Democratic | Michigan | 1,223,460 | 42.49% | 127 | William O. Butler | Kentucky | 127 |
| Martin Van Buren | Free Soil | New York | 291,501 | 10.12% | 0 | Charles Francis Adams Sr. | Massachusetts | 0 |
| Gerrit Smith | Liberty | New York | 2,545 | 0.09% | 0 | Charles C. Foote | Michigan | 0 |
| Other | | | 285 | 0.01% | — | Other | | — |
| Total | | | 2,879,184 | 100% | 290 | | | 290 |
| Needed to win | | | | | 146 | | | 146 |

Source (Popular Vote): Leip, David. "1848 Presidential Election Results". Dave Leip's Atlas of U.S. Presidential Elections. Source (Electoral Vote): "Electoral College Box Scores 1789–1996". National Archives and Records Administration. ^{(a)} The popular vote figures exclude South Carolina where the Electors were chosen by the state legislature rather than by popular vote.

Popular vote
| Taylor | 47.28% |
| Cass | 42.49% |
| Van Buren | 10.12% |
| Others | 0.11% |

Electoral vote
| Taylor | 56.21% |
| Cass | 43.79% |

=== Geography of results ===
==== Cartographic gallery ====
Map of presidential election results by county, shaded according to winning candidate's percentage of the vote

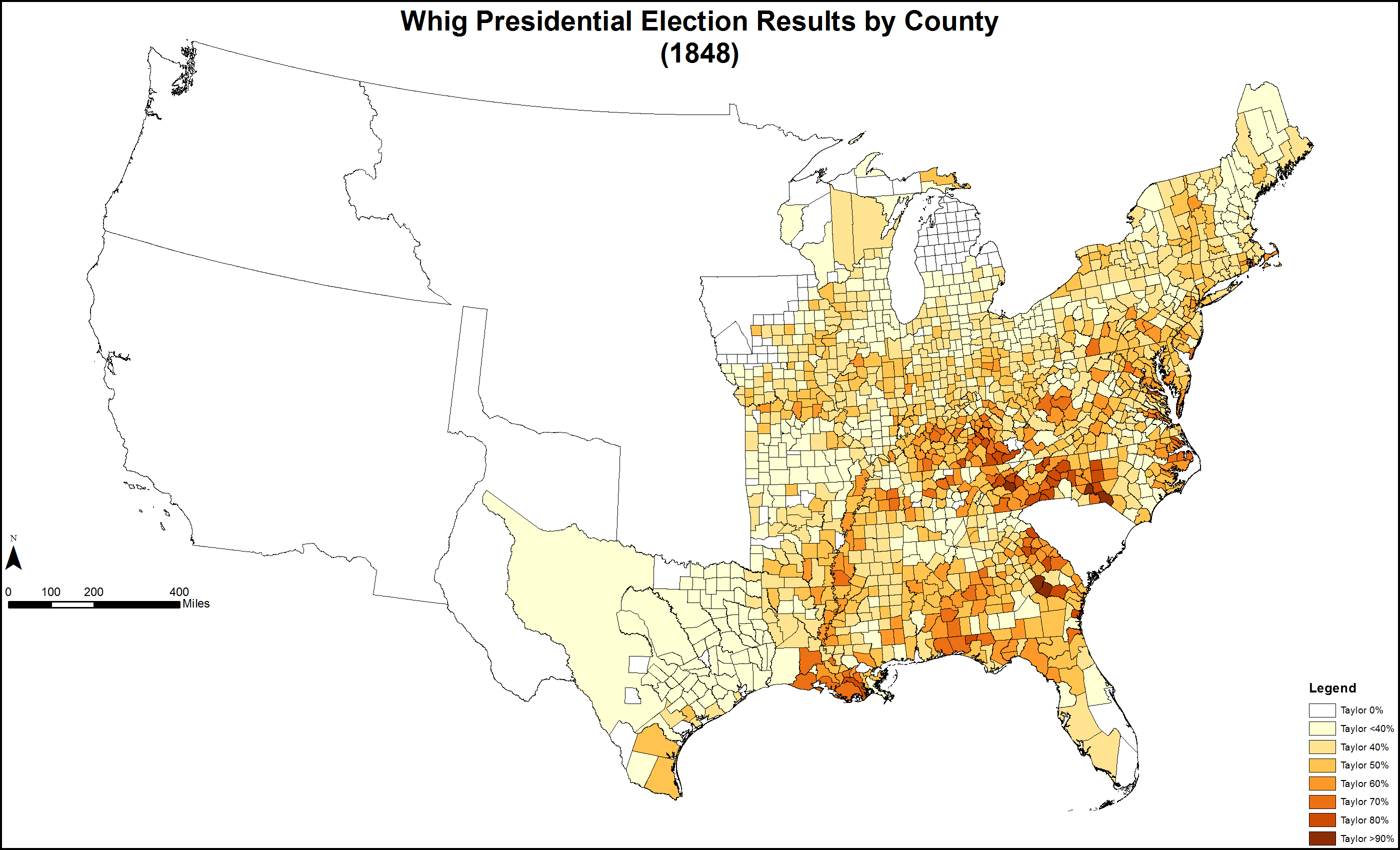
Map of Whig presidential election results by county

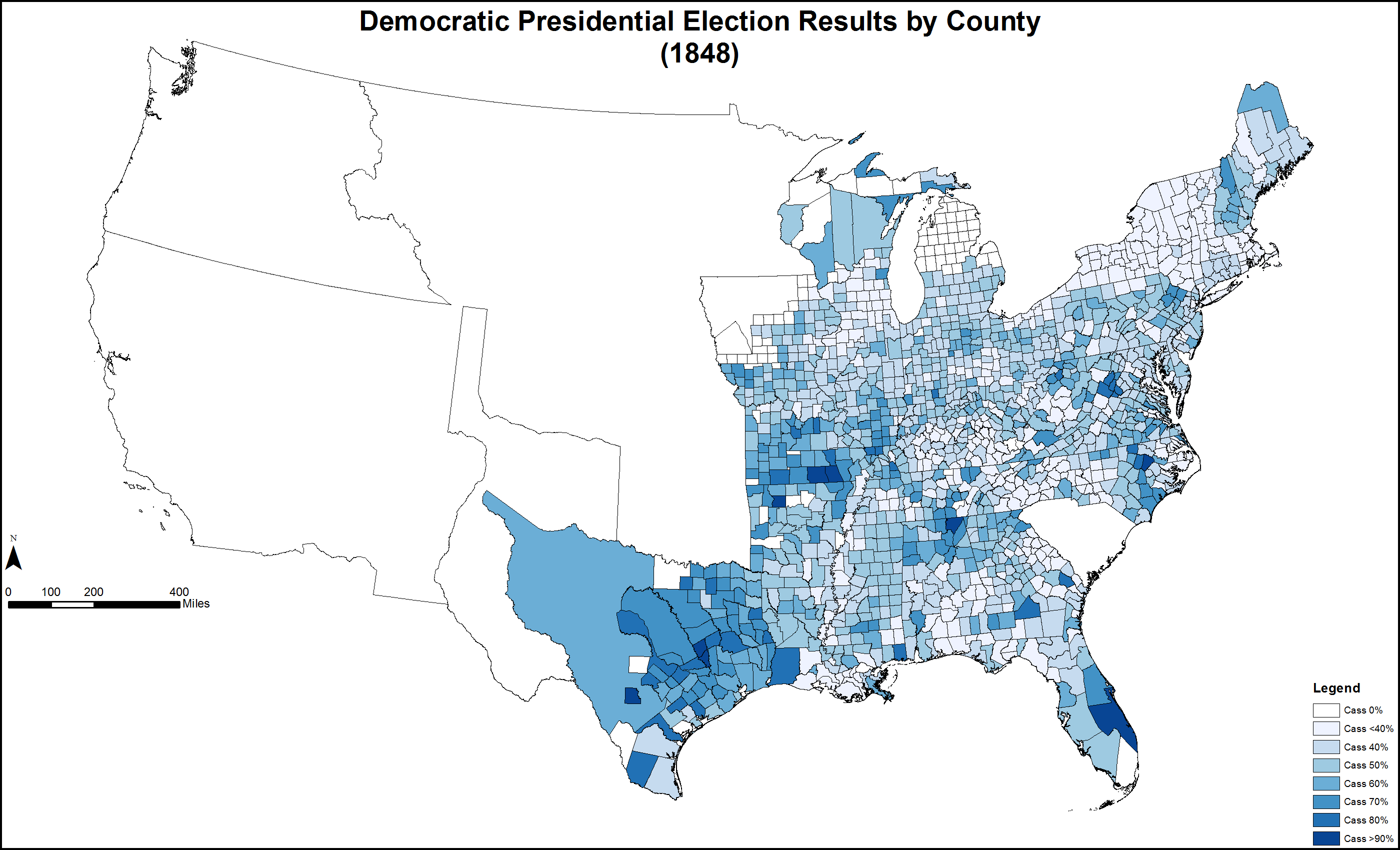
Map of Democratic presidential election results by county

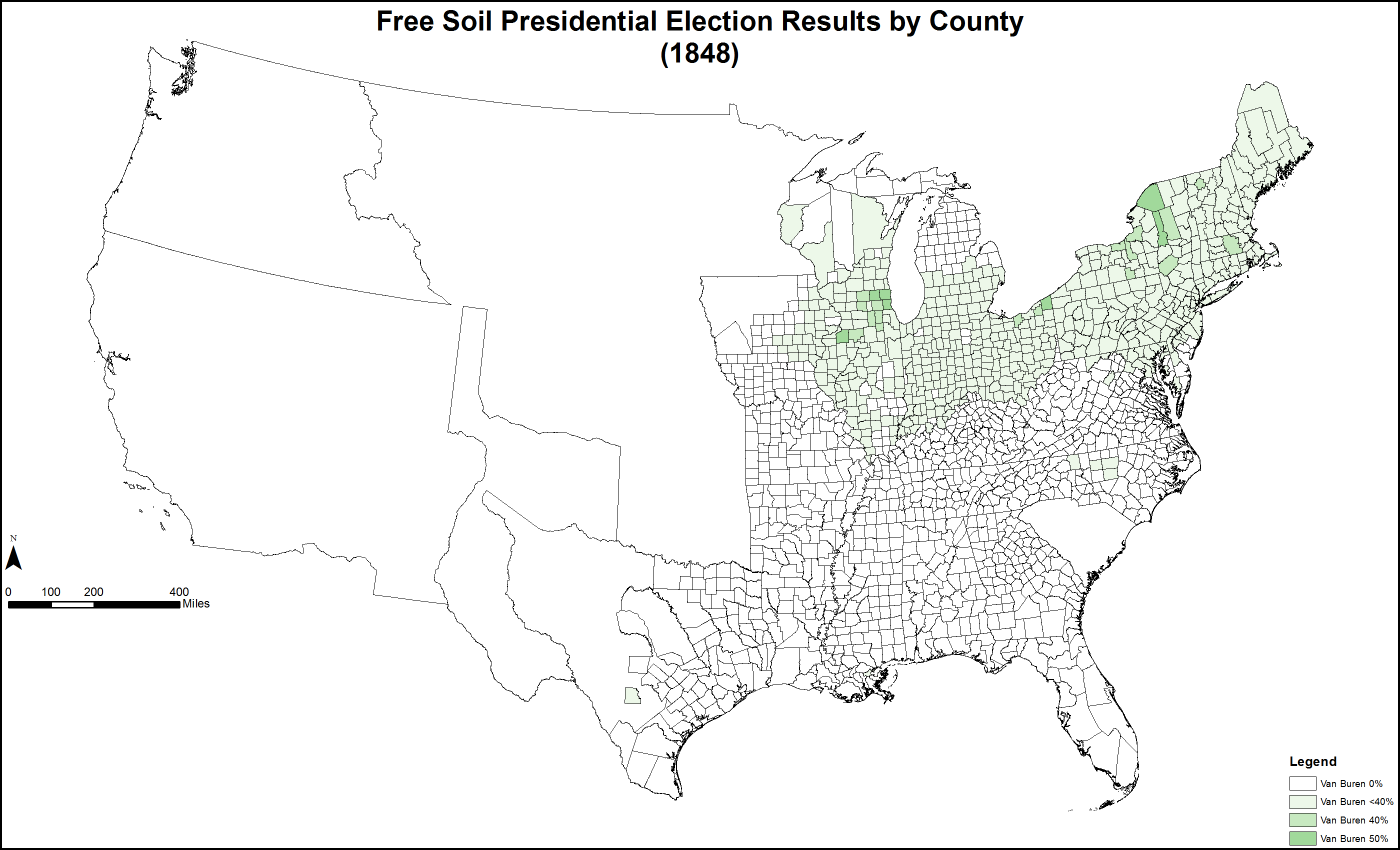
Map of Free Soil presidential election results by county

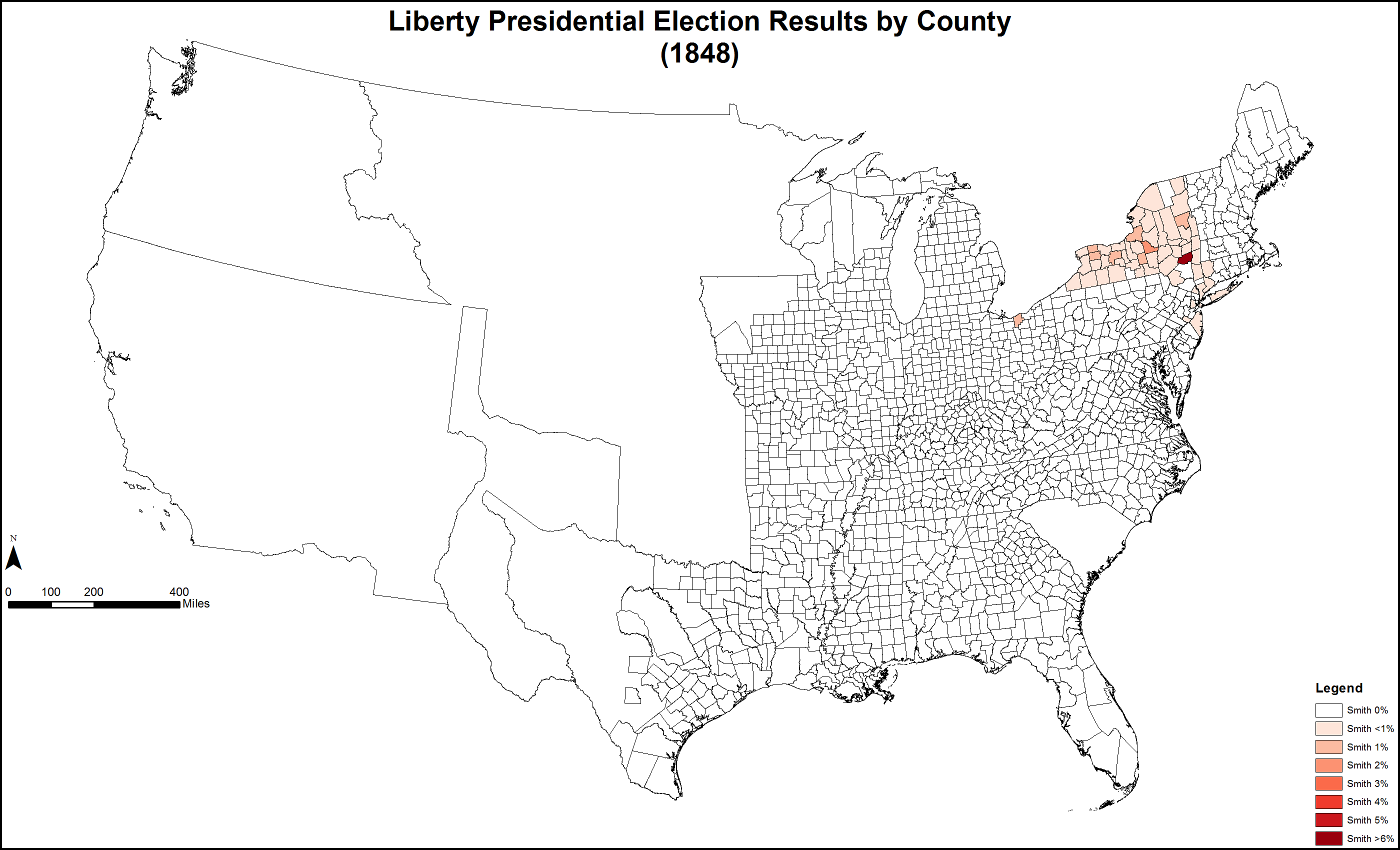
Map of Liberty presidential election results by county

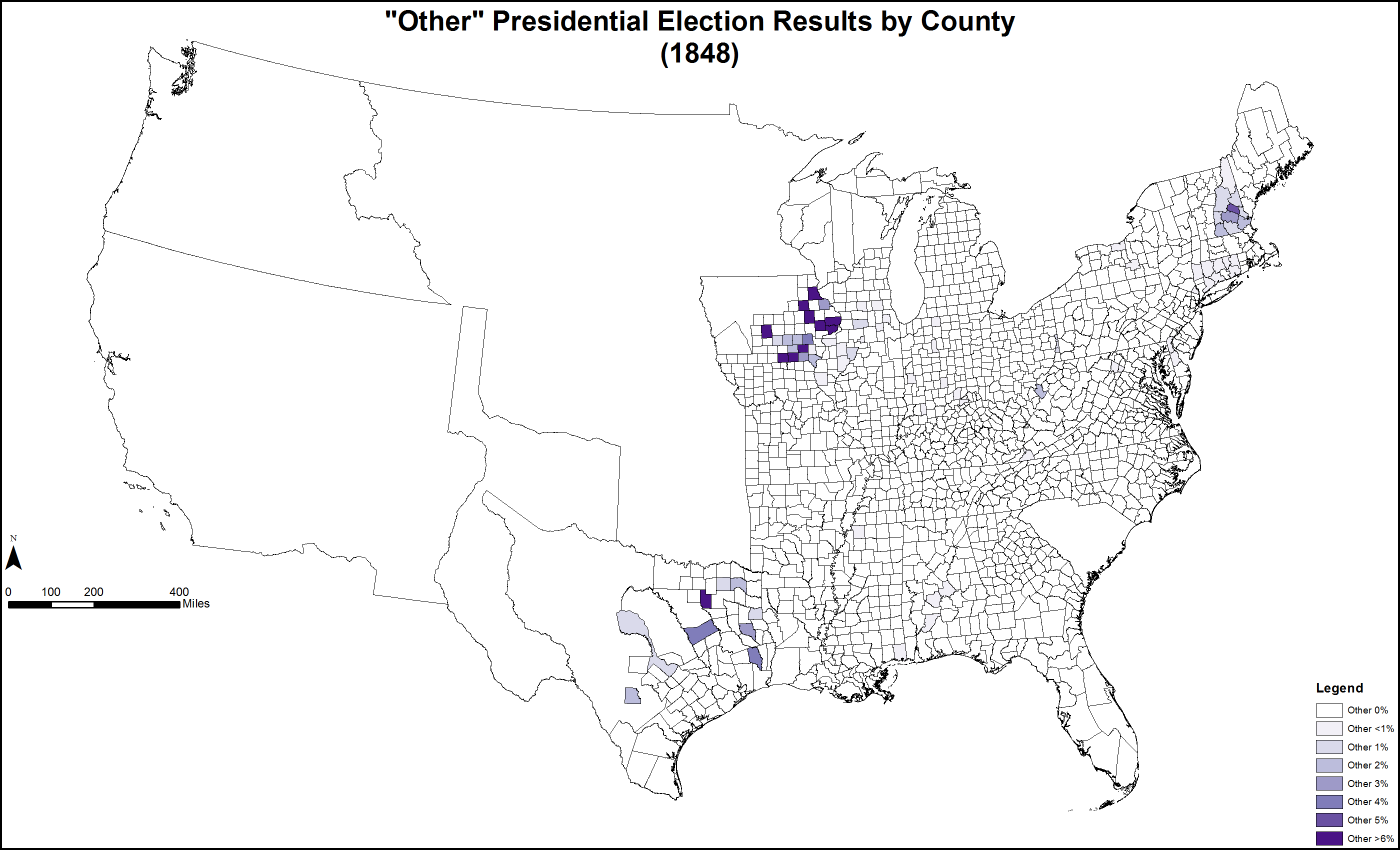
Map of "Other" presidential election results by county

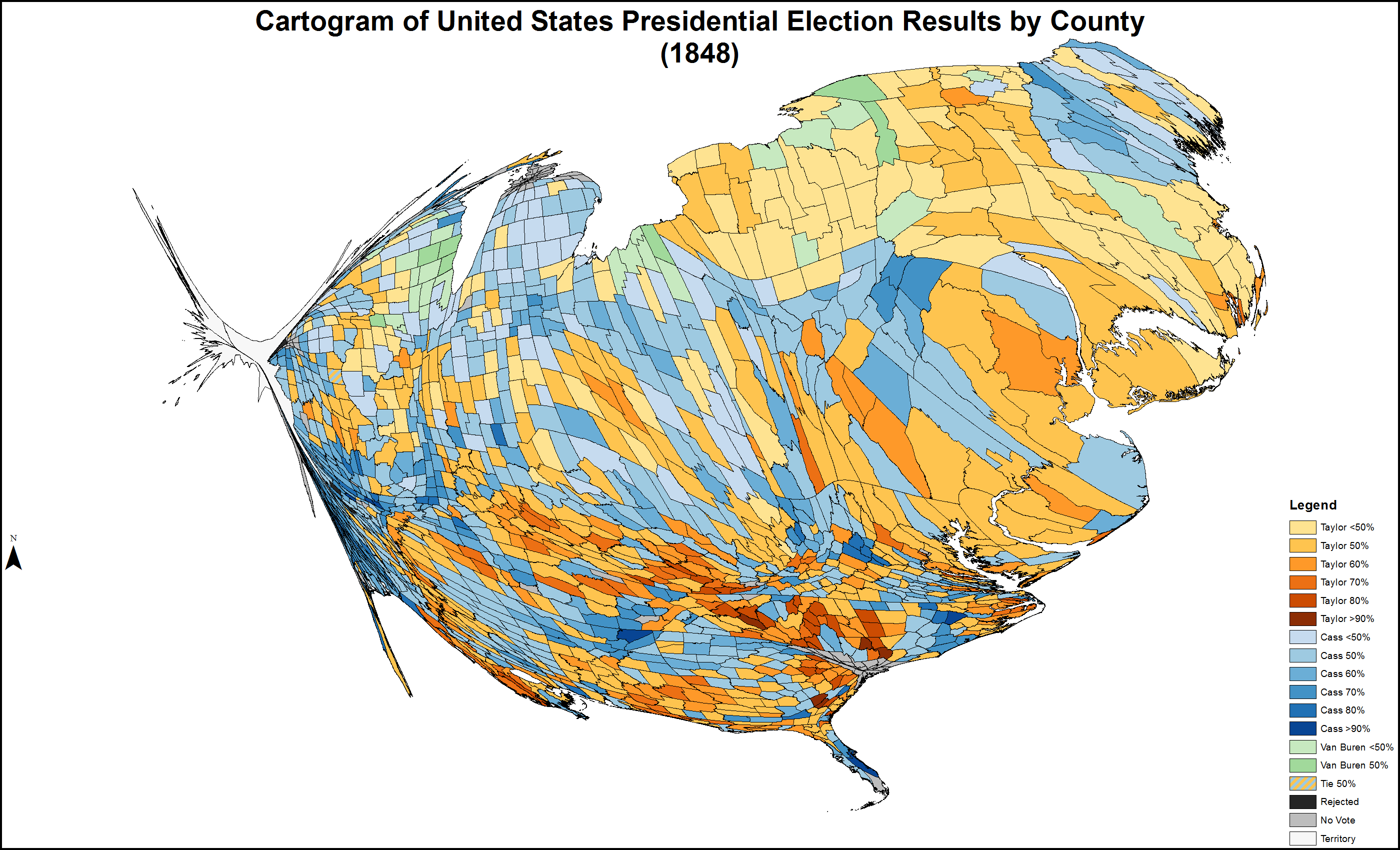
Cartogram of presidential election results by county

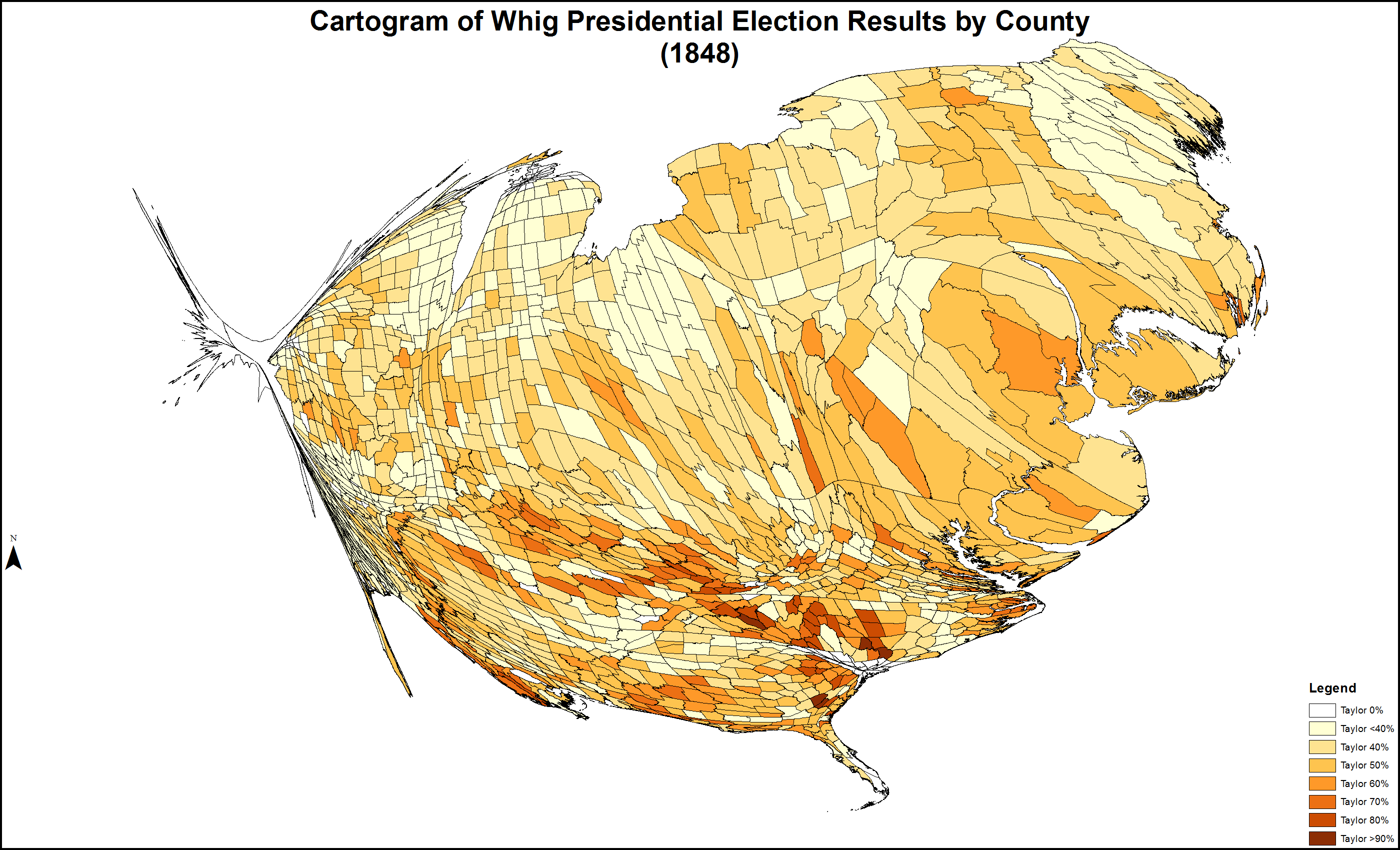
Cartogram of Whig presidential election results by county

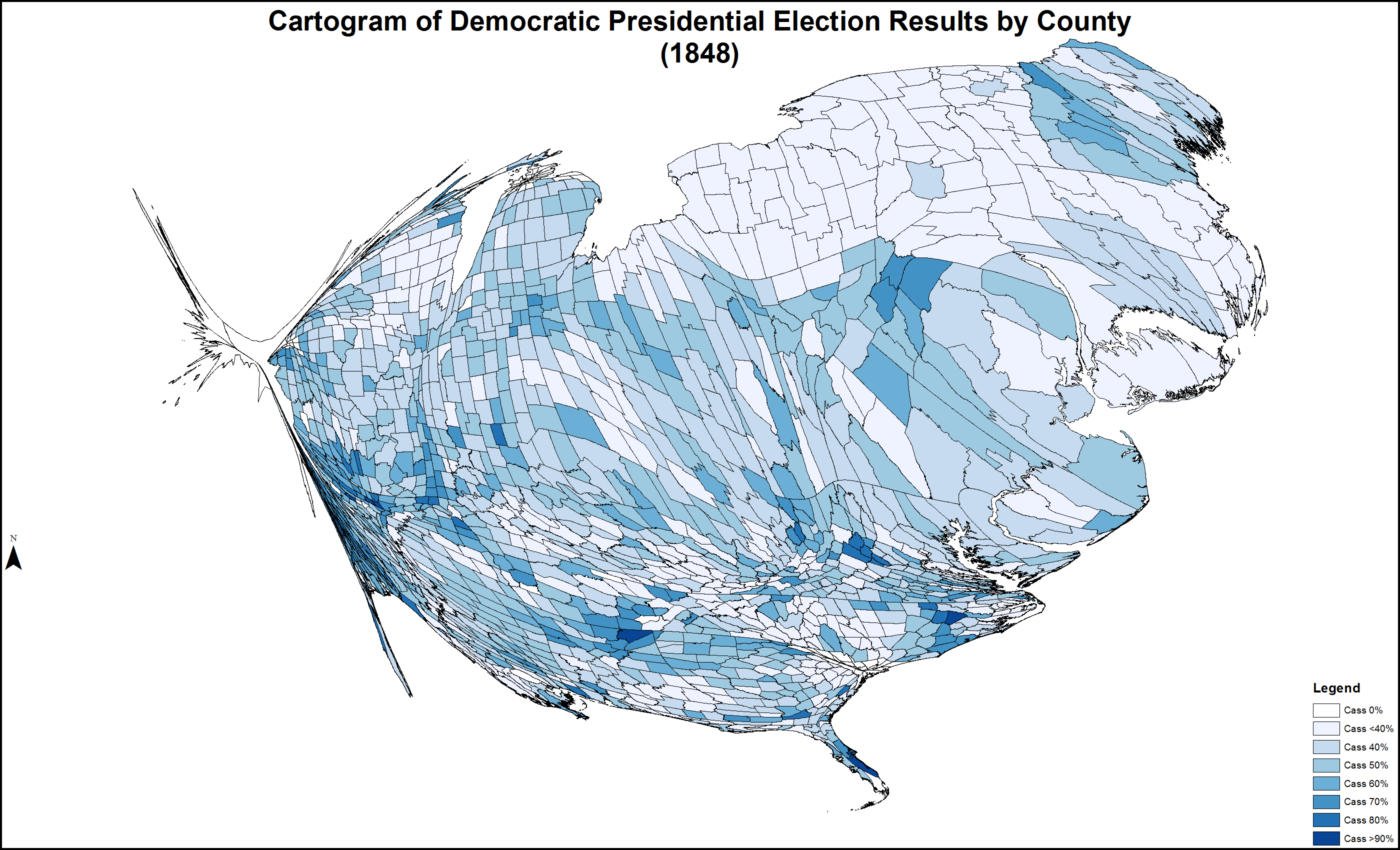
Cartogram of Democratic presidential election results by county

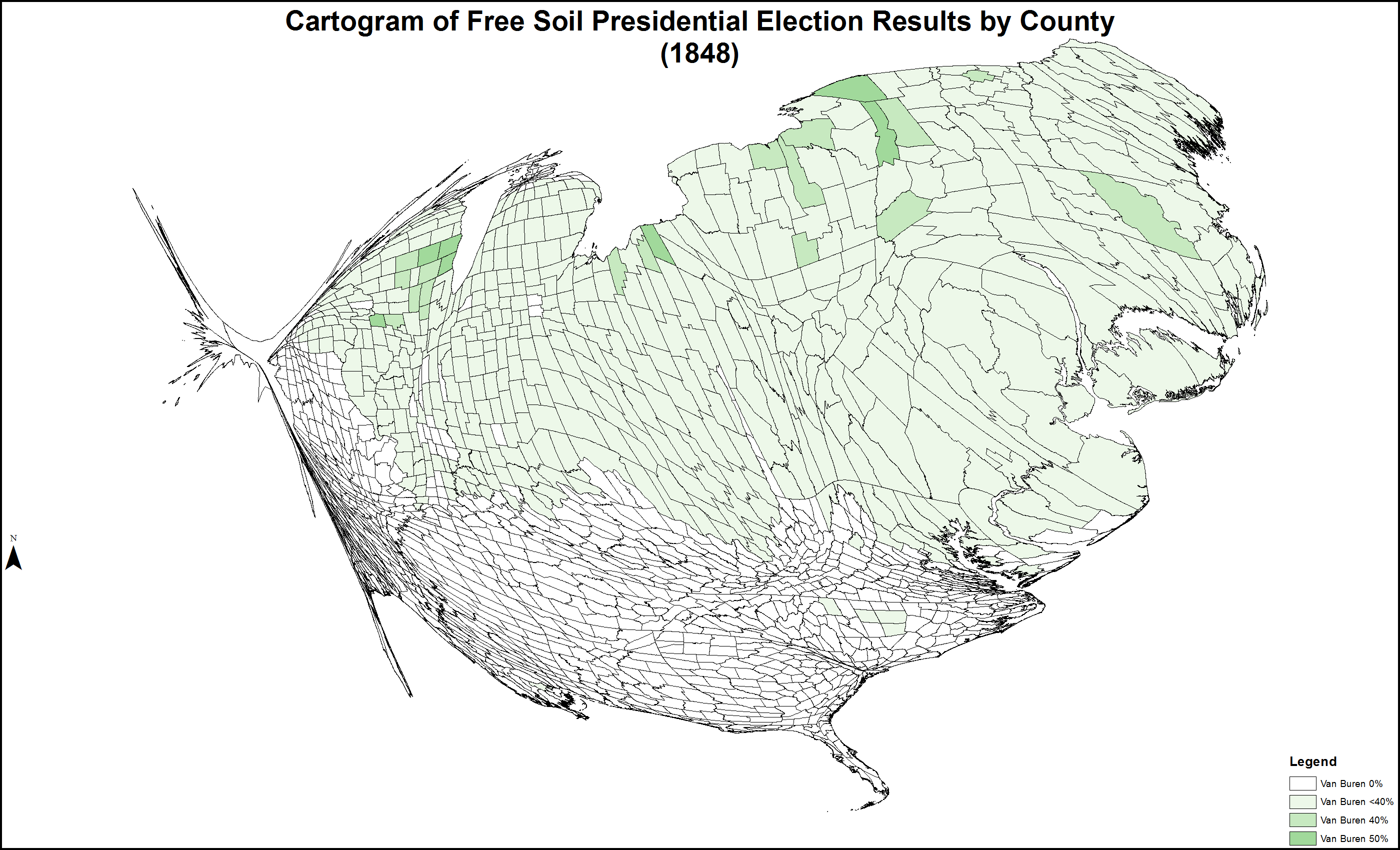
Cartogram of Free Soil presidential election results by county

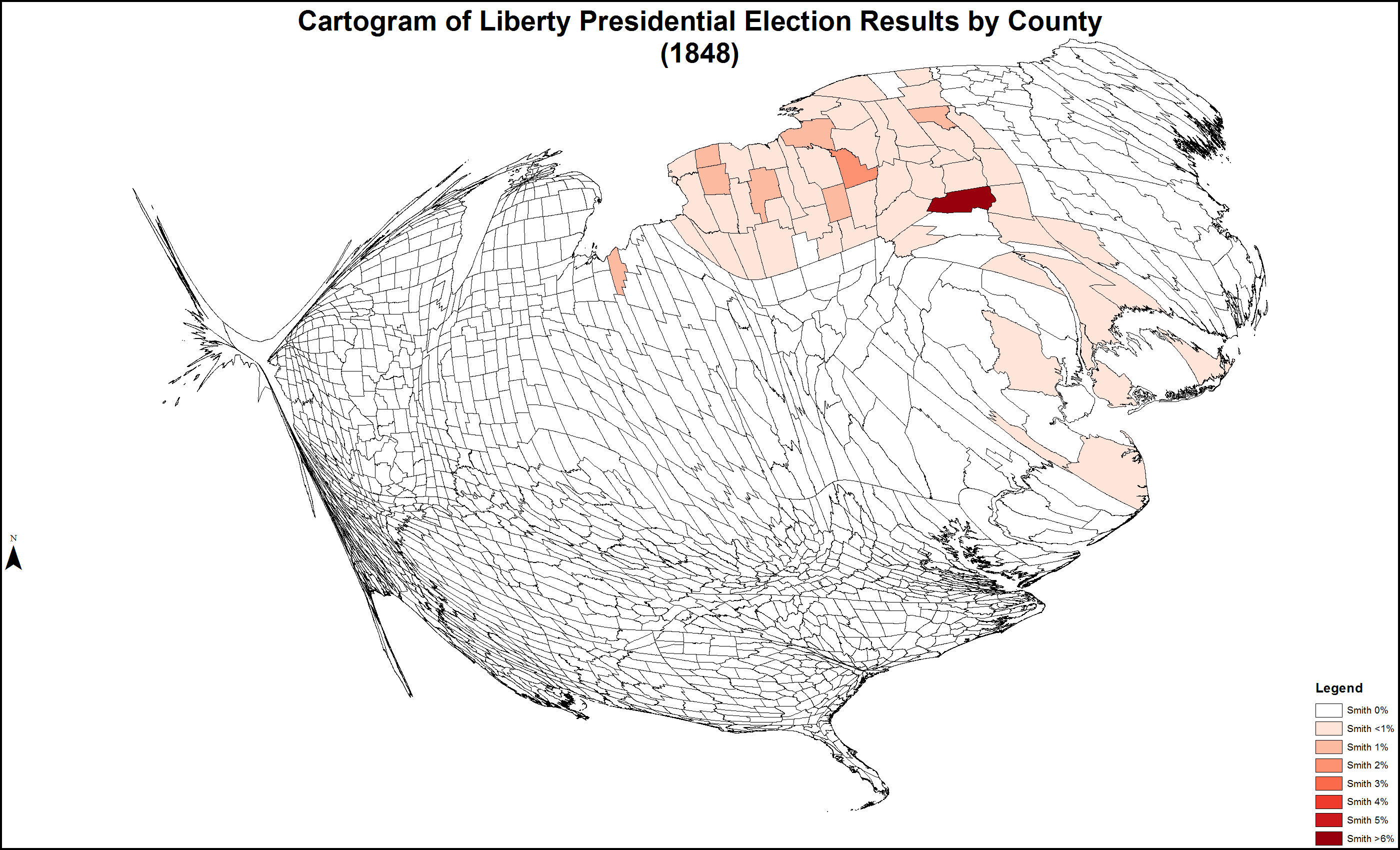
Cartogram of Liberty presidential election results by county

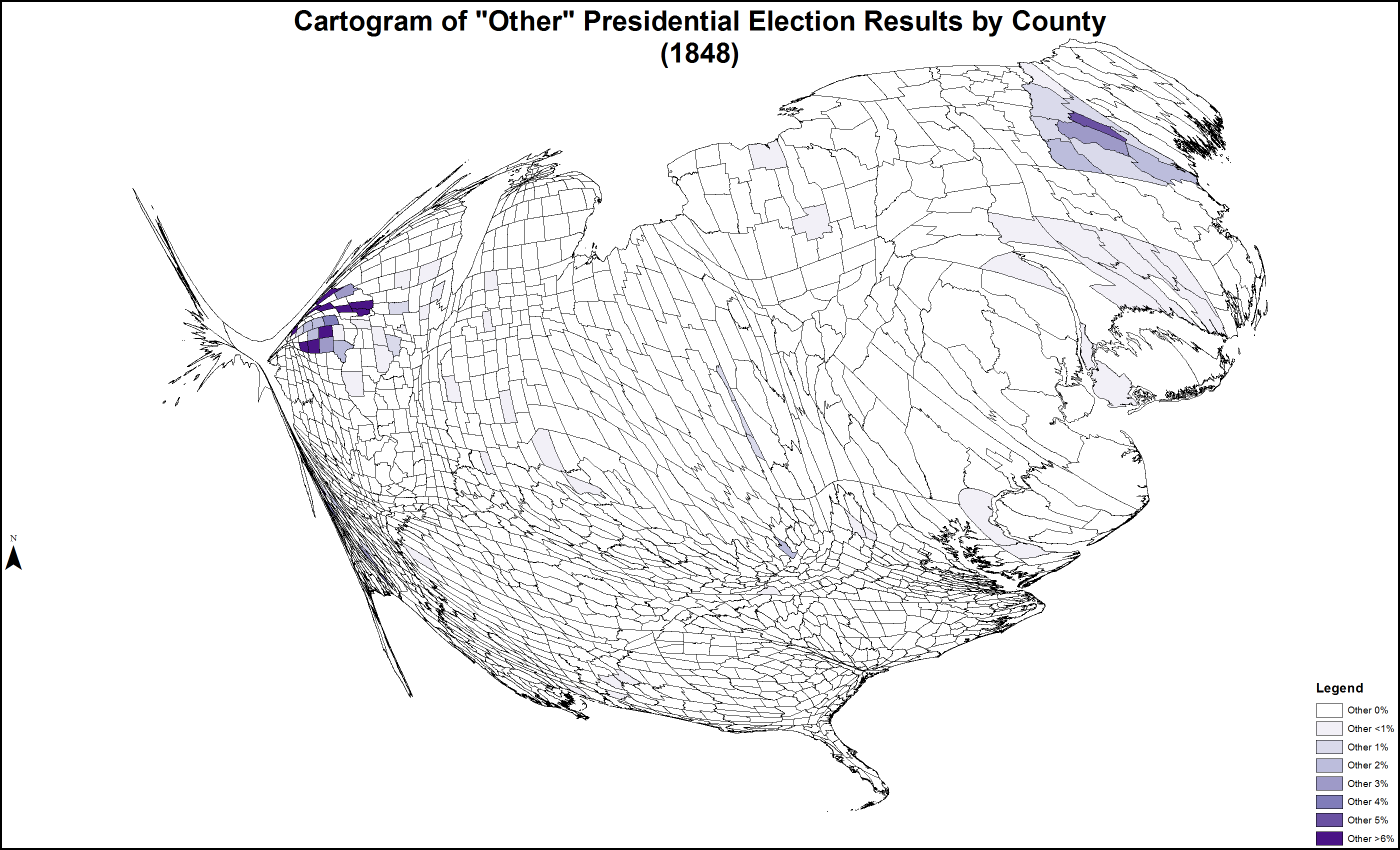
Cartogram of "Other" presidential election results by county

== Results by state ==
States/districts won by Cass/Butler
States/districts won by Taylor/Fillmore

| | | Zachary Taylor Whig | | | Lewis Cass Democratic | | | Martin Van Buren Free Soil | | | Margin | | State Total | |
| State | electoral votes | # | % | electoral votes | # | % | electoral votes | # | % | electoral votes | # | % | # | |
|---|---|---|---|---|---|---|---|---|---|---|---|---|---|---|
| Alabama | 9 | 30,482 | 49.44 | - | 31,173 | 50.56 | 9 | no ballots | | | -691 | -1.12 | 61,655 | AL |
| Arkansas | 3 | 7,587 | 44.93 | - | 9,301 | 55.07 | 3 | no ballots | | | -1,714 | -10.14 | 16,888 | AR |
| Connecticut | 6 | 30,318 | 48.59 | 6 | 27,051 | 43.35 | - | 5,005 | 8.02 | - | 3,267 | 5.24 | 62,398 | CT |
| Delaware | 3 | 6,440 | 51.80 | 3 | 5,910 | 47.54 | - | 82 | 0.66 | - | 530 | 4.26 | 12,423 | DE |
| Florida | 3 | 4,120 | 57.20 | 3 | 3,083 | 42.80 | - | no ballots | | | 1,037 | 14.40 | 7,203 | FL |
| Georgia | 10 | 47,532 | 51.49 | 10 | 44,785 | 48.51 | - | no ballots | | | 2,747 | 2.98 | 92,317 | GA |
| Illinois | 9 | 52,853 | 42.42 | - | 55,952 | 44.91 | 9 | 15,702 | 12.60 | - | -3,099 | -2.49 | 124,596 | IL |
| Indiana | 12 | 69,907 | 45.77 | - | 74,745 | 48.93 | 12 | 8,100 | 5.30 | - | -4,838 | -3.16 | 152,752 | IN |
| Iowa | 4 | 9,930 | 44.59 | - | 11,238 | 50.46 | 4 | 1,103 | 4.95 | - | -1,308 | -5.87 | 22,271 | IA |
| Kentucky | 12 | 67,145 | 57.46 | 12 | 49,720 | 42.54 | - | no ballots | | | 17,425 | 14.92 | 116,865 | KY |
| Louisiana | 6 | 18,487 | 54.59 | 6 | 15,379 | 45.41 | - | no ballots | | | 3,108 | 9.18 | 33,866 | LA |
| Maine | 9 | 35,273 | 40.25 | - | 40,195 | 45.87 | 9 | 12,157 | 13.87 | - | -4,922 | -5.62 | 87,625 | ME |
| Maryland | 8 | 37,702 | 52.10 | 8 | 34,528 | 47.72 | - | 129 | 0.18 | - | 3,174 | 4.38 | 72,359 | MD |
| Massachusetts | 12 | 61,072 | 45.32 | 12 | 35,281 | 26.18 | - | 38,333 | 28.45 | - | 22,739 | 16.87 | 134,748 | MA |
| Michigan | 5 | 23,947 | 36.80 | - | 30,742 | 47.24 | 5 | 10,393 | 15.97 | - | -6,795 | -10.44 | 65,082 | MI |
| Mississippi | 6 | 25,911 | 49.40 | - | 26,545 | 50.60 | 6 | no ballots | | | -634 | -1.20 | 52,456 | MS |
| Missouri | 7 | 32,671 | 44.91 | - | 40,077 | 55.09 | 7 | no ballots | | | -7,406 | -10.18 | 72,748 | MO |
| New Hampshire | 6 | 14,781 | 29.50 | - | 27,763 | 55.41 | 6 | 7,560 | 15.09 | - | -12,982 | -25.91 | 50,104 | NH |
| New Jersey | 7 | 40,015 | 51.48 | 7 | 36,901 | 47.47 | - | 819 | 1.05 | - | 3,114 | 4.01 | 77,735 | NJ |
| New York | 36 | 218,583 | 47.94 | 36 | 114,319 | 25.07 | - | 120,497 | 26.43 | - | 98,086 | 21.51 | 455,944 | NY |
| North Carolina | 11 | 44,054 | 55.17 | 11 | 35,772 | 44.80 | - | no ballots | | | 8,282 | 10.37 | 79,826 | NC |
| Ohio | 23 | 138,359 | 42.12 | - | 154,773 | 47.12 | 23 | 35,347 | 10.76 | - | -16,414 | -5.00 | 328,479 | OH |
| Pennsylvania | 26 | 185,313 | 50.28 | 26 | 171,976 | 46.66 | - | 11,263 | 3.06 | - | 13,337 | 3.62 | 368,552 | PA |
| Rhode Island | 4 | 6,779 | 60.77 | 4 | 3,646 | 32.68 | - | 730 | 6.54 | - | 3,133 | 28.09 | 11,155 | RI |
| South Carolina | 9 | no popular vote | | | no popular vote | | 9 | no popular vote | | | - | - | - | SC |
| Tennessee | 13 | 64,321 | 52.52 | 13 | 58,142 | 47.48 | - | no ballots | | | 6,179 | 5.04 | 122,463 | TN |
| Texas | 4 | 4,509 | 29.71 | - | 10,668 | 70.29 | 4 | no ballots | | | -6,159 | -40.58 | 15,177 | TX |
| Vermont | 6 | 23,132 | 48.27 | 6 | 10,948 | 22.85 | - | 13,837 | 28.87 | - | 9,295 | 19.40 | 47,922 | VT |
| Virginia | 17 | 45,265 | 49.20 | - | 46,739 | 50.80 | 17 | no ballots | | | -1,474 | -1.60 | 92,004 | VA |
| Wisconsin | 4 | 13,747 | 35.10 | - | 15,001 | 38.30 | 4 | 10,418 | 26.60 | - | -1,254 | -3.20 | 39,166 | WI |
| TOTALS: | 290 | 1,360,235 | 47.28 | 163 | 1,222,353 | 42.49 | 127 | 291,475 | 10.13 | - | | | 2,876,818 | US |
| TO WIN: | 146 | | | | | | | | | | | | | |

=== States that flipped from Democratic to Whig ===
- Georgia
- Louisiana
- New York
- Pennsylvania

=== States that flipped from Whig to Democratic ===
- Ohio

=== Close states ===
States where the margin of victory was under 5%:

1. Alabama 1.12% (691 votes)
2. Mississippi 1.20% (634 votes)
3. Virginia 1.60% (1,474 votes)
4. Illinois 2.49% (3,099 votes)
5. Georgia 2.98% (2,747 votes)
6. Indiana 3.16% (4,838 votes)
7. Wisconsin 3.20% (1,254 votes)
8. Pennsylvania 3.62% (13,337 votes) (tipping point state)
9. New Jersey 4.01% (3,114 votes)
10. Delaware 4.26% (530 votes)
11. Maryland 4.38% (3,174 votes)

States where the margin of victory was under 10%:

1. Ohio 5.00% (16,414 votes)
2. Tennessee 5.04% (6,179 votes)
3. Connecticut 5.24% (3,267 votes)
4. Maine 5.62% (4,922 votes)
5. Iowa 5.87% (1,308 votes)
6. Louisiana 9.18% (3,108 votes)

=== Electoral college selection ===
| Method of choosing electors | State(s) |
|---|---|
| Each Elector appointed by state legislature | South Carolina |
| Each Elector chosen by voters statewide | (all other States) * |

* Massachusetts law provided that the state legislature would choose the Electors if no slate of Electors could command a majority of voters statewide. In 1848, this provision was triggered, although the legislature ultimately chose the electors of the plurality vote winner, Taylor.

== See also ==
- Bibliography of Zachary Taylor
- 1848–49 United States House of Representatives elections
- 1848–49 United States Senate elections
- American election campaigns in the 19th century
- History of the United States (1815–1849)
- Inauguration of Zachary Taylor
