= 1848 United States presidential election in Massachusetts =

- November 7, 1848
- Turnout: 64.6% ▼0.8 pp
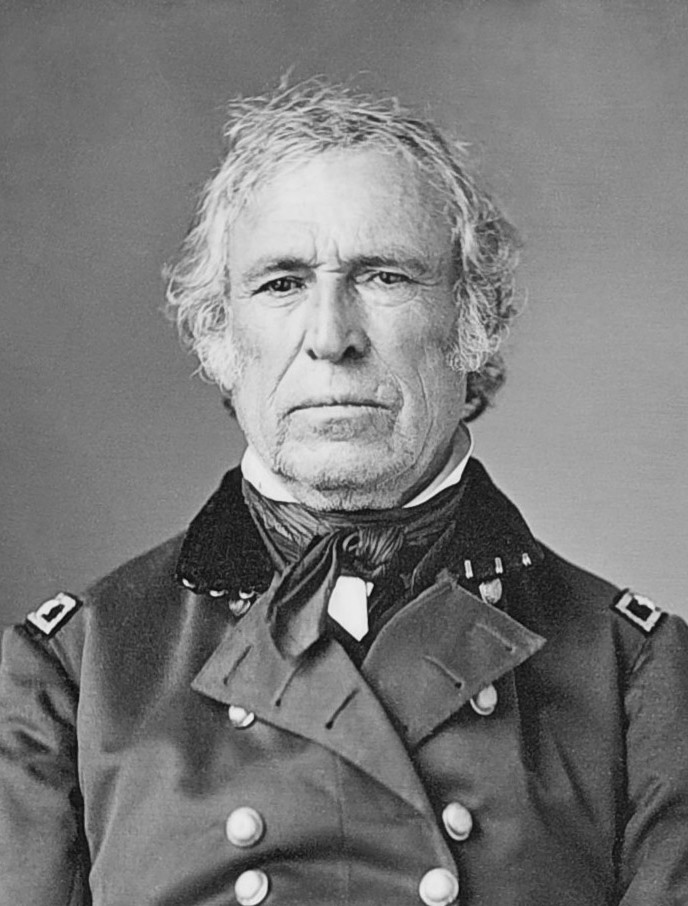

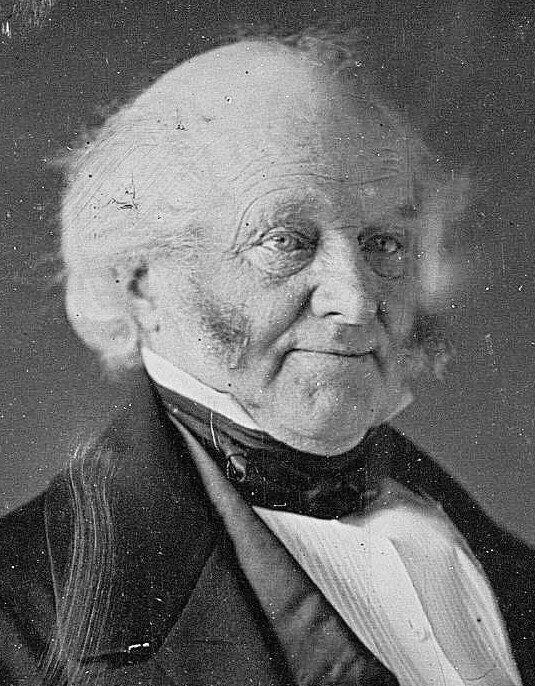

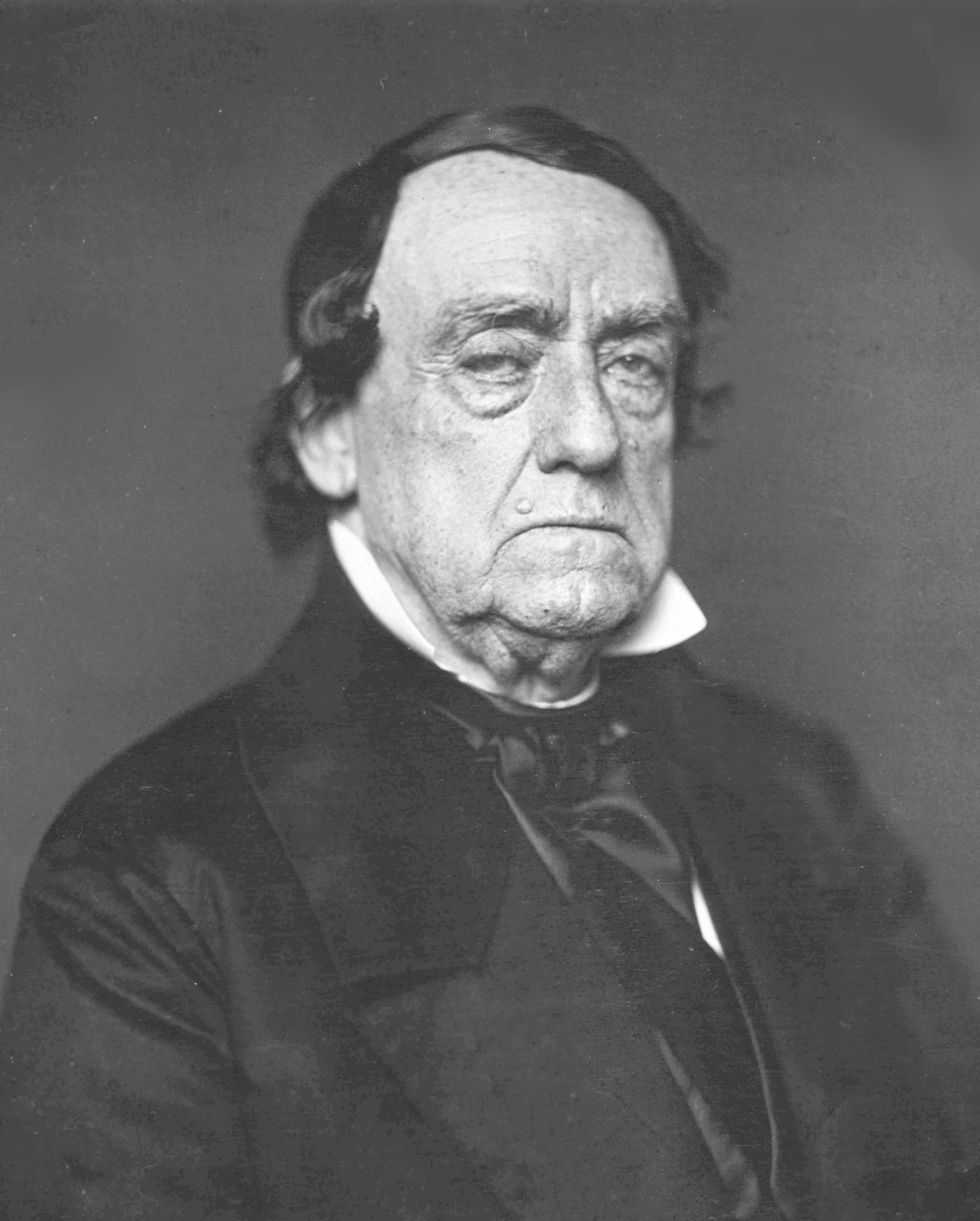
Nominee	Zachary Taylor	Martin Van Buren	Lewis Cass
Party	Whig	Free Soil	Democratic
Home state	Louisiana	New York	Michigan
Running mate	Millard Fillmore	Charles Francis Adams Sr.	William O. Butler
Electoral vote	12	0	0
Popular vote	61,072	38,333	35,281
Percentage	45.32%	28.45%	26.18%
County results
Taylor
40–50%
50–60%
60–70%
Van Buren
40–50%
President before election
James K. Polk
Democratic
Elected President
Zachary Taylor
Whig

The 1848 United States presidential election in Massachusetts took place on November 7, 1848, as part of the 1848 United States presidential election. Voters chose 12 representatives, or electors to the Electoral College, who voted for President and Vice President.

Massachusetts voted for the Whig candidate, Zachary Taylor, over Democratic candidate Lewis Cass and Free Soil candidate former president Martin Van Buren. Taylor won the state by a margin of 19.1%.

With 28.45% of the popular vote, Massachusetts would prove to be Van Buren's second strongest state in the country after neighboring Vermont.

Because no candidate received 50% of the vote, the choice of electors formally reverted to the state legislature, in accordance with the provisions of Massachusetts state law of the time. Ultimately this did not change the outcome since the Whigs controlled the legislature, which duly confirmed the choice of electors pledged to the clear plurality winner. Even if the Massachusetts legislature had chosen someone else, Taylor would have still had enough electoral votes (151, five more than a bare majority) to win the presidency.

== Results ==
1848 United States presidential election in Massachusetts
Party	Candidate	Running mate	Popular vote		Electoral vote	
Party	Candidate	Running mate	Count	%	Count	%
Whig	Zachary Taylor of Louisiana	Millard Fillmore of New York	61,072	45.32%	12	100.00%
Free Soil	Martin Van Buren of New York	Charles Francis Adams Sr. of Massachusetts	38,333	28.45%	0	0.00%
Democratic	Lewis Cass of Michigan	William O. Butler of Kentucky	35,281	26.18%	0	0.00%
N/A	Others	Others	62	0.05%	0	0.00%
Total			134,748	100.00%	12	100.00%

== See also ==
- United States presidential elections in Massachusetts
