= 1848 United States presidential election in Vermont =

- November 7, 1848
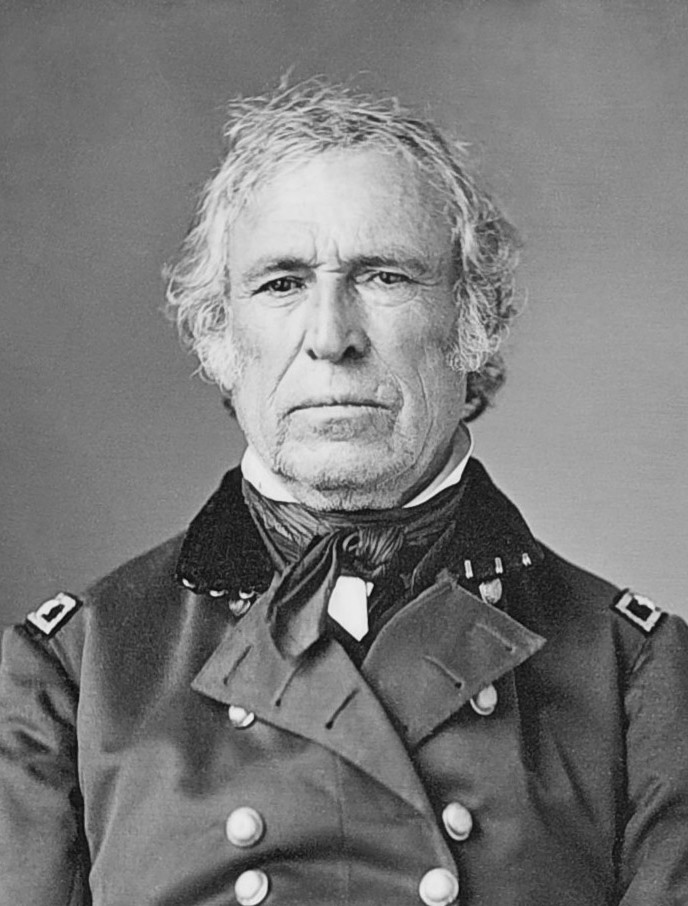

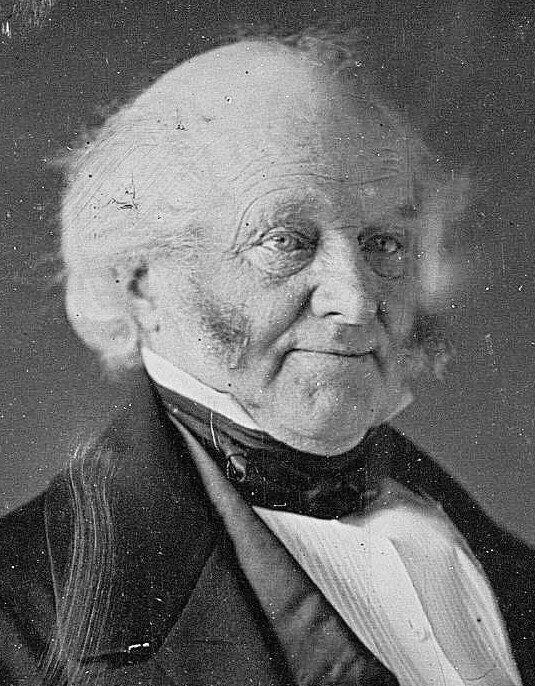

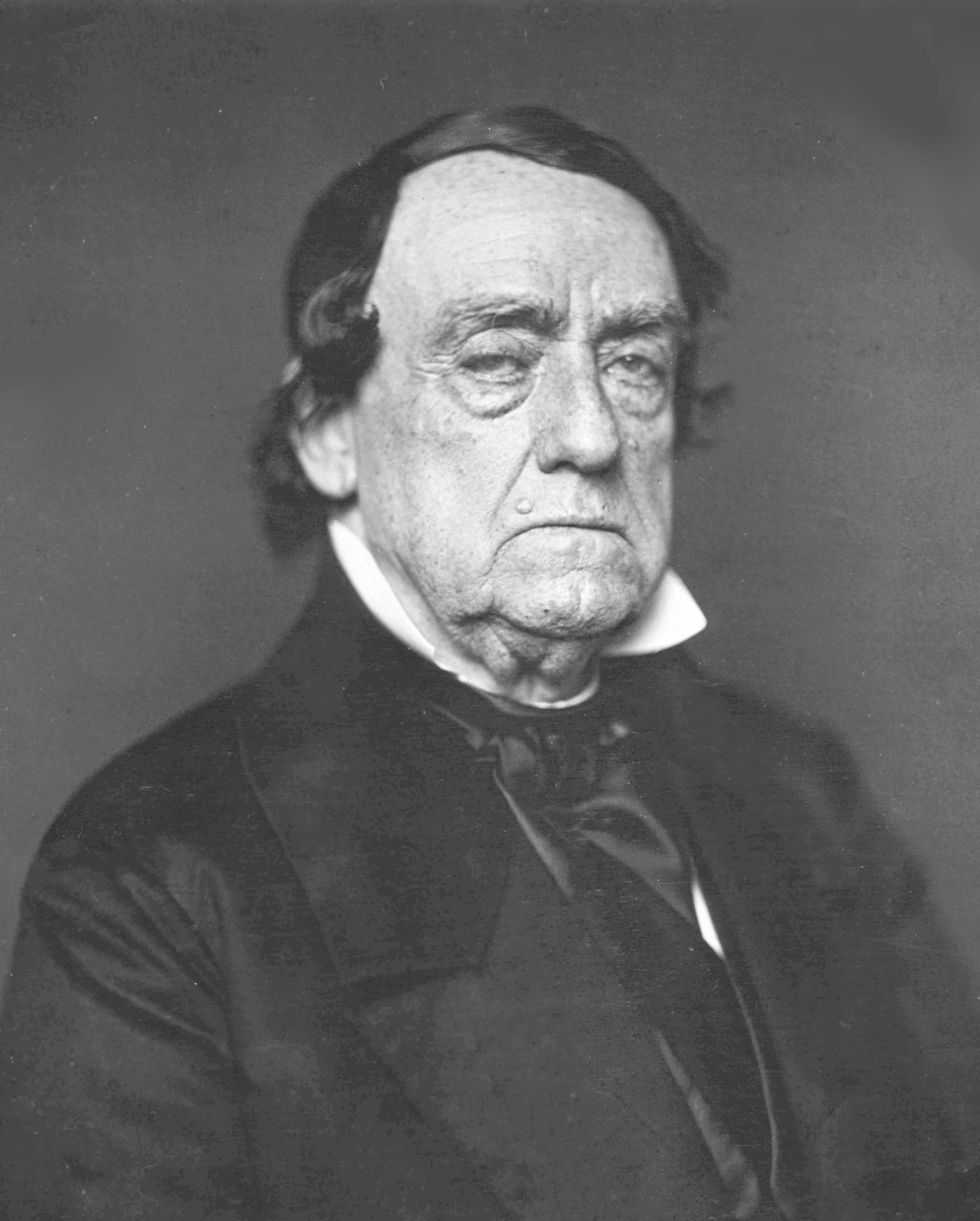
Nominee	Zachary Taylor	Martin Van Buren	Lewis Cass
Party	Whig	Free Soil	Democratic
Home state	Louisiana	New York	Michigan
Running mate	Millard Fillmore	Charles Francis Adams Sr.	William O. Butler
Electoral vote	6	0	0
Popular vote	23,132	13,837	10,948
Percentage	48.27%	28.87%	22.85%

Taylor
30–40%
40–50%
50–60%
60–70%
70–80%
80–90%
90–100%
Van Buren
30–40%
40–50%
50–60%
60–70%
70–80%
80–90%
90–100%
Cass
30–40%
40–50%
50–60%
60–70%
70–80%
80–90%
90–100%
Tie
30–40%
40–50%
no vote
President before election
James K. Polk
Democratic
Elected President
Zachary Taylor
Whig

The 1848 United States presidential election in Vermont took place on November 7, 1848, as part of the 1848 United States presidential election. Voters chose six representatives, or electors to the Electoral College, who voted for President and Vice President.

Vermont voted for the Whig candidate, Zachary Taylor, over Free Soil candidate, former president Martin Van Buren, and Democratic candidate Lewis Cass. Taylor won the state by a margin of 19.4%.

This would be the first presidential election in Vermont where a third-party candidate carried second place. Van Buren did somewhat better in Vermont in this election than he did in 1840. Van Buren received 13,887 popular votes with 28.87% of the vote in 1848 compared to 1840, where he only received 35.47% of the popular vote with 18,009 votes when he lost to Whig candidate William Henry Harrison, who received 63.9% of the popular vote with 32,445 votes. Vermont would prove to be Van Buren's strongest state in the election.

While Cass won Washington County and Van Buren won Lamoille County, this would be the last presidential election in Vermont until 1912 where a Democratic candidate would carry at least one county in the state.

== Results ==
1848 United States presidential election in Vermont
Party	Candidate	Running mate	Popular vote		Electoral vote	
Party	Candidate	Running mate	Count	%	Count	%
Whig	Zachary Taylor of Louisiana	Millard Fillmore of New York	23,132	48.27%	6	100.00%
Free Soil	Martin Van Buren of New York	Charles Francis Adams Sr. of Massachusetts	13,837	28.87%	0	0.00%
Democratic	Lewis Cass of Michigan	William O. Butler of Kentucky	10,948	22.85%	0	0.00%
N/A	Others	Others	5	0.01%	0	0.00%
Total			47,922	100.00%	6	100.00%

=== Results by county ===
County	Zachary Taylor Whig		Martin Van Buren Free Soil		Lewis Cass Democratic		Margin		Total votes cast
County	#	%	#	%	#	%	#	%	Total votes cast
Addison	2,558	65.39%	1,035	26.46%	319	8.15%	1,523	38.93%	3,912
Bennington	1,559	46.89%	616	18.53%	1,150	34.59%	409	12.30%	3,325
Caledonia	1,367	40.05%	888	26.02%	1,158	33.93%	209	6.12%	3,413
Chittenden	1,763	45.79%	1,516	39.38%	571	14.83%	247	6.42%	3,850
Essex	370	49.80%	42	5.65%	331	44.55%	39	5.25%	743
Franklin	1,466	43.62%	1,204	35.82%	691	20.56%	262	7.80%	3,361
Grand Isle	311	57.06%	104	19.08%	130	23.85%	181	33.21%	545
Lamoille	289	19.05%	754	49.70%	474	31.25%	280	-18.46%	1,517
Orange	1,780	39.54%	1,308	29.05%	1,414	31.41%	366	8.13%	4,502
Orleans	1,056	49.03%	536	24.88%	562	26.09%	494	22.93%	2,154
Rutland	2,911	57.85%	1,377	27.36%	744	14.79%	1,534	30.48%	5,032
Washington	1,398	33.31%	1,106	26.35%	1,693	40.34%	295	-7.03%	4,197
Windham	2,648	56.35%	1,443	30.71%	608	12.94%	1,205	25.64%	4,699
Windsor	3,656	54.84%	1,908	28.62%	1,103	16.54%	1,748	26.22%	6,667
Totals	23,132	48.28%	13,837	28.88%	10,948	22.85%	9,295	19.40%	47,917

== See also ==
- United States presidential elections in Vermont
