= Gerrit Smith (disambiguation) =

Gerrit Smith may refer to:

- Gerrit Smith (1797–1874), United States social reformer, abolitionist, politician, and philanthropist
- Gerrit Smith (composer) (1859–1912), American composer and organist
- Gerrit Smith (rugby union) (born 1988), South African rugby union player

== See also ==
- Gerrit Smith Estate, in Peterboro, New York, the home of Gerrit Smith
- Gerrit Smith Miller (1845–1937), Gerrit Smith's grandson, dairy farmer who introduced Holstein cattle to the U.S.
- Gerrit Smith Miller Jr., (1869–1956), son of the previous, American zoologist and botanist
