= 1839 Warsaw Convention =

Meeting of the New York State Anti-Slavery Society

Warsaw convention
- Location within the United States
- Date: November 13–14, 1839
- Venue: Presbyterian church
- Location: Warsaw, New York; 42°44′24″N 78°07′59″W
- Organized by: New York State Anti-Slavery Society
- Participants: 500
- Outcome: James G. Birney nominated for president; Francis Julius LeMoyne nominated for vice president

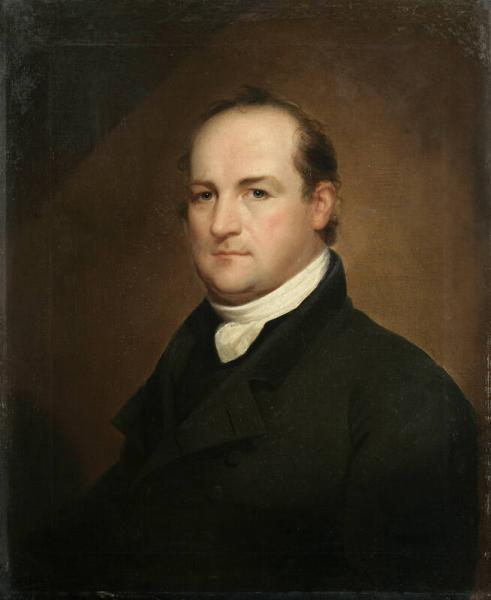
Myron Holley, organizer of the Warsaw and Arcade conventions

The New York State Anti-Slavery Society held a convention at the Presbyterian church in Warsaw, New York, on November 13 and 14, 1839. The more than 500 attendees included abolitionists from Western New York and neighboring Pennsylvania. Josiah Andrews of Perry, New York, presided over the meeting, while Holley and William L. Chaplin served on the five-member committee on resolutions. Most of the measures reported by the committee passed unanimously, but the third resolution declaring "that the elector who votes for a candidate for the state or national legislature not known to be the decided advocate of impartial freedom [...] is no less criminal than he would be, if in the primary assemblies he should vote directly against freedom, and in favor of oppressive, cruel and chattelizing laws," was adopted in a contested vote, 22 to 12. The sixth resolution endorsing the creation of a new abolitionist party was adopted unanimously. The convention nominated Birney for president and Francis Julius LeMoyne of Pennsylvania for vice president, and appointed Holley, Andrews, and Joshua H. Darling to prepare an address to the electorate.

Both Birney and LeMoyne declined the nomination of the Warsaw convention. LeMoyne felt an independent ticket was untimely and inexpedient, and warned that the action of the convention suggested a worrying lack of confidence in the moral influence of abolitionism. Birney approved the principle of independent nominations, but felt the Warsaw convention was not an appropriate venue, and that a candidate should be selected by a national gathering of abolitionists. His conditional refusal set in motion the chain of events leading to the 1840 abolitionist presidential nominating convention.

== Bibliography ==
- Birney, William (1890). James G. Birney and His Times. New York: D. Appleton and Company.
- Sewell, Richard H. (1976). Ballots for Freedom: Antislavery Politics in the United States, 1837–1860. New York: Oxford University Press. LCCN 75-25464.
- Young, Andrew W. (1869). History of the Town of Warsaw, New York, [...]. Buffalo, NY.
