= Smithfield Presbyterian Church =

Smithfield Presbyterian Church may refer to:

- Smithfield Presbyterian Church (Amenia, New York), listed on the NRHP
- Smithfield Presbyterian Church (Peterboro, New York), listed on the NRHP
