= Peterboro Area Museum =

Coordinates: 42°58′1.5″N 75°40′58.5″W

The Peterboro Area Museum, 4608 Peterboro Road, Peterboro, New York, is located in the former schoolhouse of the Home for Destitute Children of Madison County. It contains memorabilia related to movements and people of the community: the abolitionist movement, Gerrit Smith and his family, women's rights, soccer, and the Holstein-Friesian cows raised by Smith's grandson Gerrit Smith Miller. In 2022 it is open Sundays 2pm-4pm, June through September, or by appointment.
