= Laura Smith Haviland =

American abolitionist and suffragette (1808–1898)

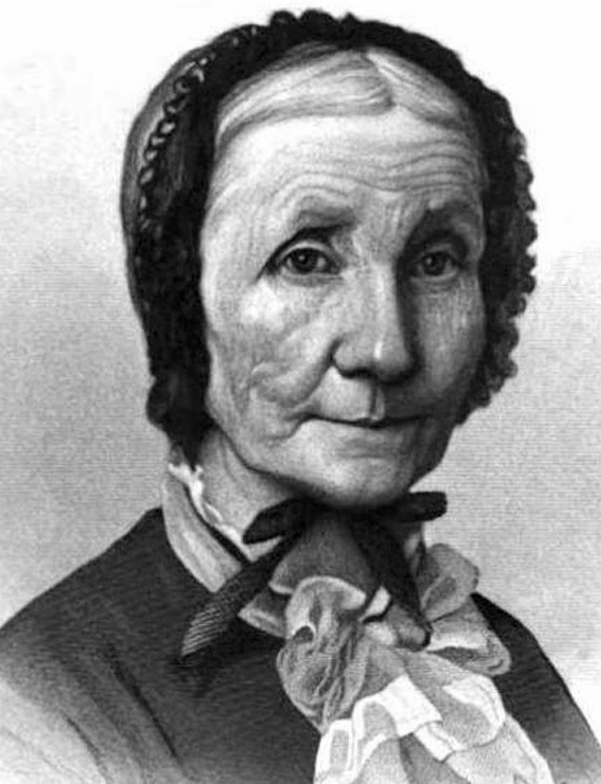
- Haviland in 1881
- Born: December 20, 1808; Kitley Township, Ontario, Canada
- Died: April 20, 1898 (aged 89); Grand Rapids, Michigan, U.S.
- Occupations: abolitionist, suffragist, temperance worker
- Spouse: Charles Haviland Jr.
- Children: 8

Laura Smith Haviland (December 20, 1808 – April 20, 1898) was an American abolitionist, suffragette, and social reformer. She was a Quaker and an important figure in the history of the Underground Railroad.

== Early years and family ==
Laura Smith Haviland was born on December 20, 1808, in Kitley Township, Ontario, Canada, to American parents Daniel Smith and Asenath "Sene" Blancher, who had immigrated shortly before her birth. Haviland wrote that Daniel was "a man of ability and influence, of clear perceptions, and strong reasoning powers," while her mother Sene was "of a gentler turn, ...a quiet spirit, benevolent and kind to all, and much beloved by all who knew her." The Smiths, farmers of modest means, were devout members of the Religious Society of Friends, better known as Quakers. Haviland's father was a minister in the Society and her mother was an Elder.

Though the Quakers dressed plainly, and strictly forbade dancing, singing, and other pursuits they deemed frivolous, many of their views were progressive by the standards of the day. The Quakers encouraged the equal education of men and women, an extraordinarily forward-thinking position in an age when most individuals were illiterate, and providing a woman with a thorough education was largely viewed as unnecessary. Quaker women as well as men acted as ministers. While most Quakers did not agitate vocally for abolition, the majority condemned slavery as brutal and unjust. It was in this atmosphere that Haviland was raised.

In 1815, her family left Canada and returned to the United States, settling in the remote and sparsely populated town of Cambria, in western New York. At the time there was no school near their home, and for the next six years Haviland's education consisted of little more than "a spelling lesson" given to her daily by her mother. Haviland described herself as an inquisitive child, deeply interested in the workings of the world around her, who at a young age began questioning her parents about everything from scripture to Newton's Law of Universal Gravitation. Once she had mastered spelling, Haviland supplemented her meager education by devouring every book she could borrow from friends, relatives, and neighbors, reading everything from religious material to serious historical studies.

At sixteen, Laura met Charles Haviland, Jr., a devout young Quaker, whose parents were both respected ministers. They were married on November 11, 1825, at Lockport, New York. According to Laura, Charles was a devoted husband and theirs was a happy marriage. They were the parents of eight children.

The Havilands spent the first four years of their marriage in Royalton Township, near Lockport, New York, before moving in September 1829, to Raisin, Lenawee County, in the Michigan Territory. They settled three miles (5 km) from the homestead her parents acquired four years earlier. Michigan was then a largely unsettled wilderness, but land was cheap, and there were a number of other Quakers in the vicinity.

== Anti-slavery work and the Raisin Institute ==
Haviland vividly recalled seeing African Americans verbally abused, and even physically assaulted, in Lockport, New York, when she was a child. These experiences, combined with the horrific descriptions in John Woolman's history of the slave-trade, made an indelible impression.

The pictures of these crowded slave-ships, with the cruelties of the slave system after they were brought to our country, often affected me to tears ... My sympathies became too deeply enlisted for the poor negroes who were thus enslaved for time to efface.

Haviland and other members of the Raisin community helped Elizabeth Margaret Chandler organize the Logan Female Anti-Slavery Society in 1832. It was the first anti-slavery organization in Michigan. Five years later, in 1837, Haviland and her husband founded a "manual labor school ... designed for indigent children," which was later known as the Raisin Institute. Haviland instructed the girls in household chores, while her husband and one of her brothers, Harvey Smith, taught the boys to perform farm work. At the Havilands' insistence, the school was open to all children, "regardless of race, creed, or sex." It was the first racially integrated school in Michigan. Some of Haviland's white students, upon learning they were to study with African Americans, threatened to leave. Most were persuaded to remain, however, and Laura wrote that once the students were together in the classroom their prejudices "soon melted away."

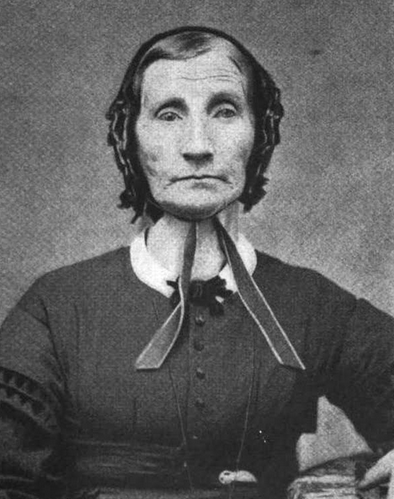
Laura Smith Haviland, from a 1910 publication

In 1838, Harvey Smith sold his farm, and the proceeds were used to erect accommodations for fifty students. The Havilands expanded the school's curriculum, operating it more closely along the lines of traditional elementary and secondary schools. They then hired a graduate of Oberlin College to serve as the school's principal. Due to their diligence, the Raisin Institute was soon recognized as one of the best schools in the Territory.

As the Havilands became more actively involved in anti-slavery work, tensions grew within the Quaker community. There was a split between the so-called "radical abolitionists," like the Havilands, who wanted immediate emancipation, and the majority of Orthodox Quakers. Although the Quakers condemned slavery, most did not approve of active participation in abolitionist societies. By 1839, in order to continue with their abolitionist work, the Havilands, her parents, and fourteen other like-minded Quakers, felt compelled to resign their membership. They then joined a group of Methodists known as the Wesleyans, who were equally devoted to the abolitionist cause.

In the spring of 1845, an epidemic of erysipelas killed six members of Haviland's family, including both her parents, her husband, and her youngest child. Haviland also fell ill, but survived. At thirty-six, Haviland was a widow with seven children to support, a farm to run, the Raisin Institute to manage, and substantial debts to repay. Two years later tragedy struck again when her eldest son died. A lack of funds forced the closing the Raisin Institute in 1849.

In spite of these personal losses, she continued work as an abolitionist; and, in 1851, she helped organize the Refugee Home Society in Windsor, Ontario, Canada, which assisted in settling fugitive slaves. A church and school were erected for them and each family was given twenty-five acres to farm. Laura remained on for several months as the settlement's teacher. She then traveled to Ohio, where, with her daughter Anna, she taught in a school founded for African-American children in Cincinnati and Toledo, Ohio.

By 1856, she returned to Michigan, having raised sufficient funds to reopen the Raisin Institute. The new curriculum included lectures by former slaves about life on a slave plantation. In 1864, the Institute closed again after many in the staff and some students enlisted to fight in the Civil War.

== Work for the Underground Railroad ==
During the 1830s, the Haviland family began hiding runaway enslaved people on their farm. Their home became the first Underground Railroad station established in Michigan. After her husband's death, Haviland continued to shelter fugitive enslaved human beings in her home, in some cases personally escorting them to Canada. She played an important role in the Detroit branch of the group, where she was considered railroad "superintendent", with George DeBaptiste the "president" and William Lambert the "vice president" or "secretary".

She also traveled to the South on multiple occasions to aid escaped enslaved people. Her first trip was made in 1846, in an effort to free the children of fugitive enslaved humans Willis and Elsie Hamilton. The children were still in the possession of their mother's former enslaver, John P. Chester, a tavern-keeper in Washington County, Tennessee.

Chester had learned of the Hamilton's whereabouts and sent slave-catchers after them. When that failed, Chester attempted to lure the Hamiltons to his plantation with the promise that they would be treated as freedmen and reunited with their children. Suspecting a trap, Haviland went to Tennessee in their place, accompanied by her son Daniel and a student from the Raisin Institute, James Martin, who posed as Willis Hamilton. Mr. Chester became irate once he realized Willis Hamilton was not with Mrs. Haviland. He held the trio at gunpoint, threatening to murder them, kidnap James Martin, and enslave him in Willis Hamilton's stead. They managed to escape, but Mr. Chester did not forget Laura Haviland. His family would continue to haunt her for fifteen years, pursuing her legally in court and privately with slave catchers, while barraging her with derogatory letters. The following letter was sent by Chester's son, Thomas K. Chester, in February 1847. It provides a good example of the tone which permeated the Chester family's correspondence with Haviland:

By your cunning villainies you have deprived us of our just rights, of our own property. ... Thanks be to an all wise and provident God that, my father has more of that sable kind of busy fellows, greasy, slick, and fat; and they are not cheated to death out of their hard earnings by villainous and infernal abolitionists, whose philanthropy is interest, and whose only desire is to swindle the slave-holder out of his own property, and convert its labor to their own infernal aggrandizement ... Who do you think would parley with a thief, a robber of man's just rights, recognized by the glorious Constitution of our Union! Such a condescension would damn an honest man, would put modesty to the blush. What! To engage in a contest with you? A rogue, a damnable thief, a Negro thief, an out-breaker, a criminal in the sight of all honest men; ... I would rather be caught with another man's sheep on my back than to engage in such a subject, and with such an individual as old Laura Haviland, a damned nigger-stealer ... You can tell Elsie that since our return my father bought her eldest daughter; that she is now his property and the mother of a likely boy, that I call Daniel Haviland after your pretty son. ... What do you think your portion will be at the great Day of Judgment? I think it will be the inner temple of hell.

Haviland responded, sarcastically thanking him for naming the child after her family and stating that she hoped "like Moses, may he become instrumental in leading his people away from a worse bondage than that of Egypt." Enraged by what he deemed her insolence, Thomas Chester placed a bounty on Haviland's head. All throughout the South he circulated "hand-bills" (fliers) describing Mrs. Haviland, detailing her abolitionist work, naming her place of residence and offering $3,000, a considerable sum at the time, to anyone willing to kidnap or murder her on his behalf.

Three years later, after the passage of the Fugitive Slave Law, the Chester family attempted to have Haviland tried under the new statute for "stealing" their slaves. Haviland not only ran the risk of being physically harmed by angry slave-owners, like the Chesters, or their slave-catchers, if found guilty of violating the Fugitive Slave Law she would also be subject to hefty fines and imprisonment. Still, Haviland was determined to continue with her work, no matter what the personal cost:

I would not for my right hand become instrumental in returning one escaped slave to bondage. I firmly believe in our Declaration of Independence, that all men are created free and equal, and that no human being has a right to make merchandise of others born in humbler stations, and place them on a level with horses, cattle, and sheep, knocking them off the auction-block to the highest bidder, sundering family ties, and outraging the purest and tenderest feelings of human nature.

Fortunately for Haviland, her case was brought before Judge Ross Wilkins, who sympathized with the abolitionists. The Chesters attempted to regain possession of the Hamiltons by force, but were prevented by Haviland and her neighbors. Judge Wilkins delayed her case, allowing Haviland to help the Hamiltons escape to Canada. In the end, Haviland evaded legal punishment.

In addition to another failed rescue attempt, detailed in her autobiography, Haviland later made other, more successful journeys south that went unmentioned in her memoirs. In the guise of a white cook, and once even posing as a fair skinned free person of color, she visited plantations and managed to help some slaves escape north.

== Civil War and Reconstruction ==
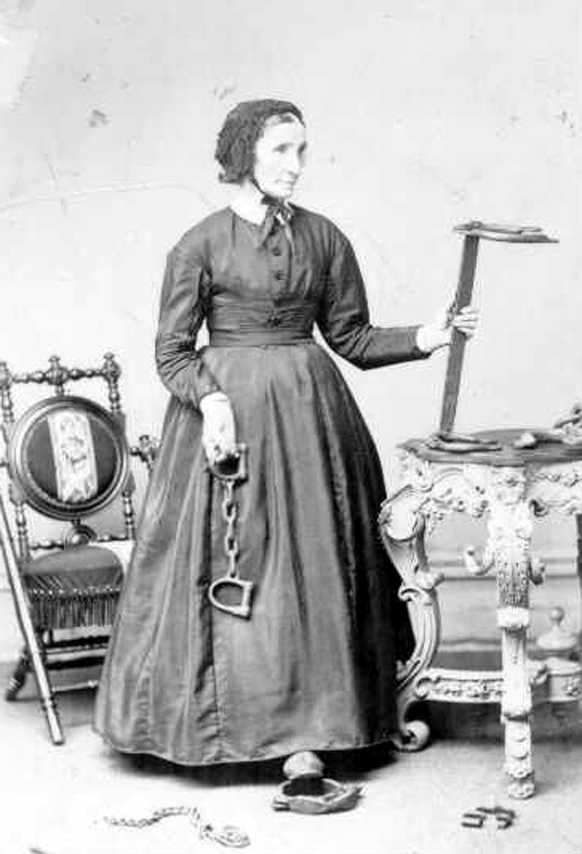
Laura Haviland holding slave irons.

During the Civil War, Laura toured many refugee camps and hospitals, even venturing onto the frontlines, to distribute supplies to displaced citizens, freed slaves, and soldiers.

In the spring of 1865, the commissioner of the newly created Freedmen's Bureau, General Oliver O. Howard, named Haviland Inspector of Hospitals. Haviland's actual duties consisted of far more than inspecting hospitals. She spent the next two years traveling through Virginia, Tennessee, Kansas, and Washington, D.C., distributing supplies, reporting on the living conditions of Freedmen and indigent whites, organizing refugee camps, establishing schools, working as a teacher, volunteering as a nurse at freedmen's hospitals, and giving public lectures. In an effort to help whites understand what the freedmen had endured under slavery, she toured abandoned plantations and collected chains, irons, restraints, and other implements which had been used on slaves. Haviland transported these items north and exhibited them during her lectures. She also met personally with President Andrew Johnson to petition for the release of former slaves still being held in Southern prisons for attempting years before to escape slavery.

While working at the Freedmen's Hospital in Washington, D.C., Haviland met and befriended Sojourner Truth, who later recalled an incident that took place one day when they had gone into town to get supplies. Haviland suggested they take a street car back to the hospital. Truth described what happened next as follows:

As Mrs. Haviland signaled the car, I stepped to one side as if to continue my walk and when it stopped I ran and jumped aboard. The conductor pushed me back, saying, 'Get out of the way and let this lady come in.' I said 'I am a lady, too.' We went with no further opposition 'til we were obliged to change cars. A man coming out as we were going into the next car asked if 'niggers were allowed to ride.' The conductor grabbed me by the shoulder and jerking me around, ordered me to get out. I told him I would not. Mrs. Haviland took hold of my other arm and said, 'Don't put her out.' The conductor asked if I belonged to her. 'No,' replied Mrs. Haviland, 'She belongs to humanity.'

== The Haviland Home orphanage ==
After the Civil War, the Freedmen's Aid Commission acquired the former Raisin Institute, renamed it the Haviland Home, and converted it into an orphanage for African-American children. Its first residents were seventy-five homeless children brought by Haviland from Kansas. As other children joined their ranks, and their numbers increased, many whites in Michigan became unnerved. They claimed that Haviland was burdening white taxpayers and demanded that Haviland Home be closed. Matters came to a head in 1867, when the orphanage was purchased by the American Missionary Association, who closed the orphanage, and literally threw the orphans out into the street.

Haviland abandoned her work in Washington, D.C., to return to Michigan and help the children. She managed to collect enough donations to purchase the orphanage and began to manage it herself. By 1870, funds were extremely scarce. The situation became so dire that, at Haviland's urging, the state took over the orphanage and it became the Michigan Orphan Asylum.

== Later years ==
When the Reconstruction ended in 1877, many African Americans fled the South, where they were subject to attacks by racist individuals and groups such as the Ku Klux Klan. Thousands of African-American men, women, and children, crowded into makeshift refugee camps in Kansas. Determined to help, Haviland set out with her daughter Anna for Washington, D.C., where she testified about the appalling conditions at the camps, before traveling to Kansas with supplies for the refugees. Using her personal savings, Haviland purchased 240 acres (0.97 km^{2}) in Kansas for the freedmen at one of the refugee camps to live on and farm.

== Death ==
During her life, Laura Haviland not only fought slavery and worked to improve the living conditions of freedmen, she was also actively involved in other social causes, advocating for women's suffrage, and helping to organize the Women's Christian Temperance Union in Michigan.

Laura Haviland died on April 20, 1898, in Grand Rapids, Michigan, at the home of her brother, Samuel Smith. She is buried next to her husband in the Raisin Valley Cemetery in Adrian, Michigan.

Symbolically, at Haviland's funeral, hymns were sung by a choir of white and African-American singers, and then her casket was carried to the grave by a group of white and African-American pall-bearers.

== Legacy ==
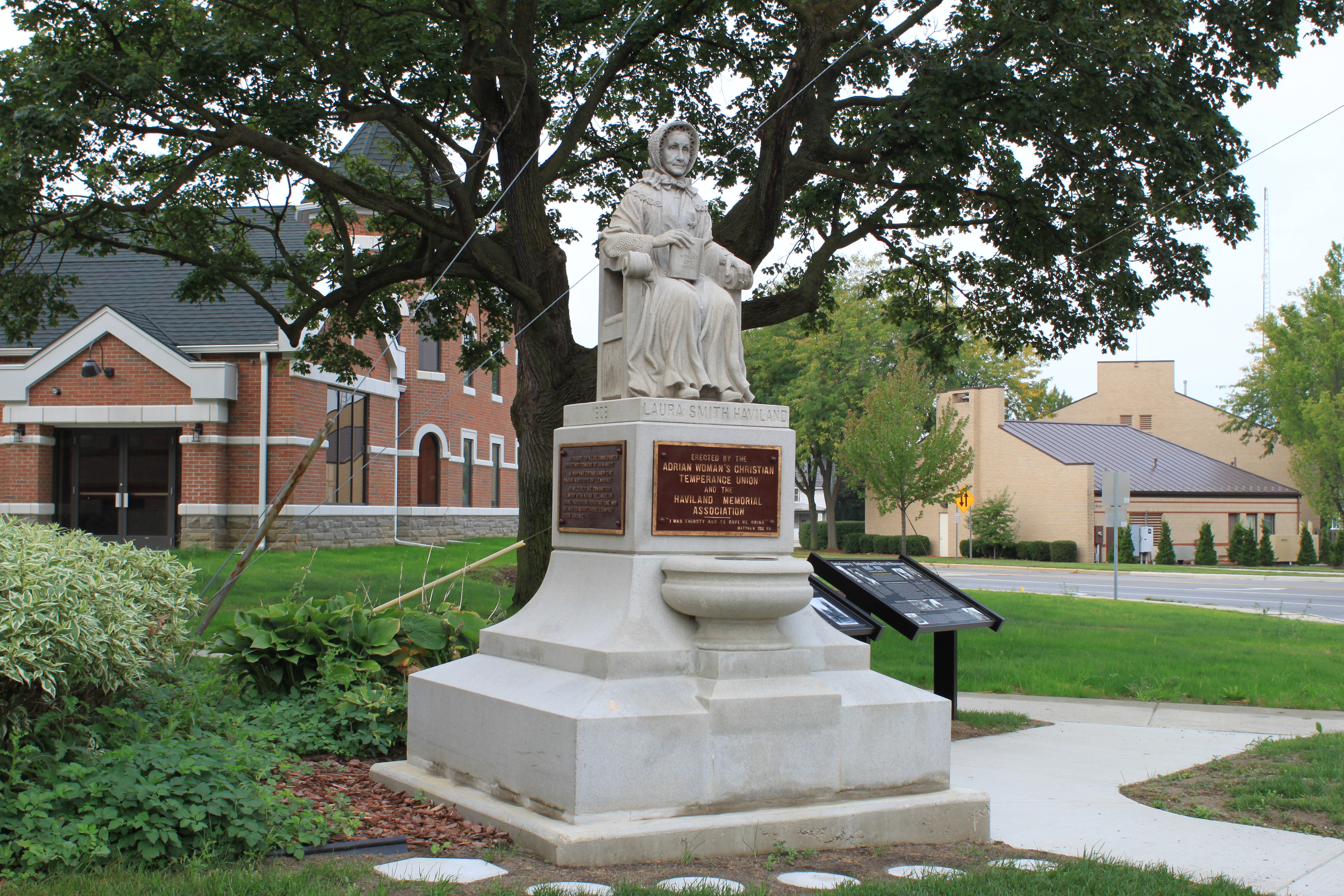
Laura Haviland statue at the Lenawee County Historical Museum in Adrian, Michigan

- The town of Haviland, Kansas, is named in her honor.
- A statue of Laura Haviland stands in front of the Lenawee County Historical Museum in Adrian, Michigan. The inscription on the statue reads: "A Tribute to a Life Consecrated to the Betterment of Humanity."
- Laura Smith Haviland Elementary School, in Waterford, Michigan, is named in her honor.
- Laura Smith Haviland was inducted into the National Abolition Hall of Fame and Museum in Peterboro, New York in 2018.

== Selected work ==
- (1866) Letter from Laura Smith Haviland to Sojourner
