= Peterboro Land Office =

Historic commercial building in New York, United States

- U.S. National Register of Historic Places
- U.S. National Historic Landmark District – Contributing property
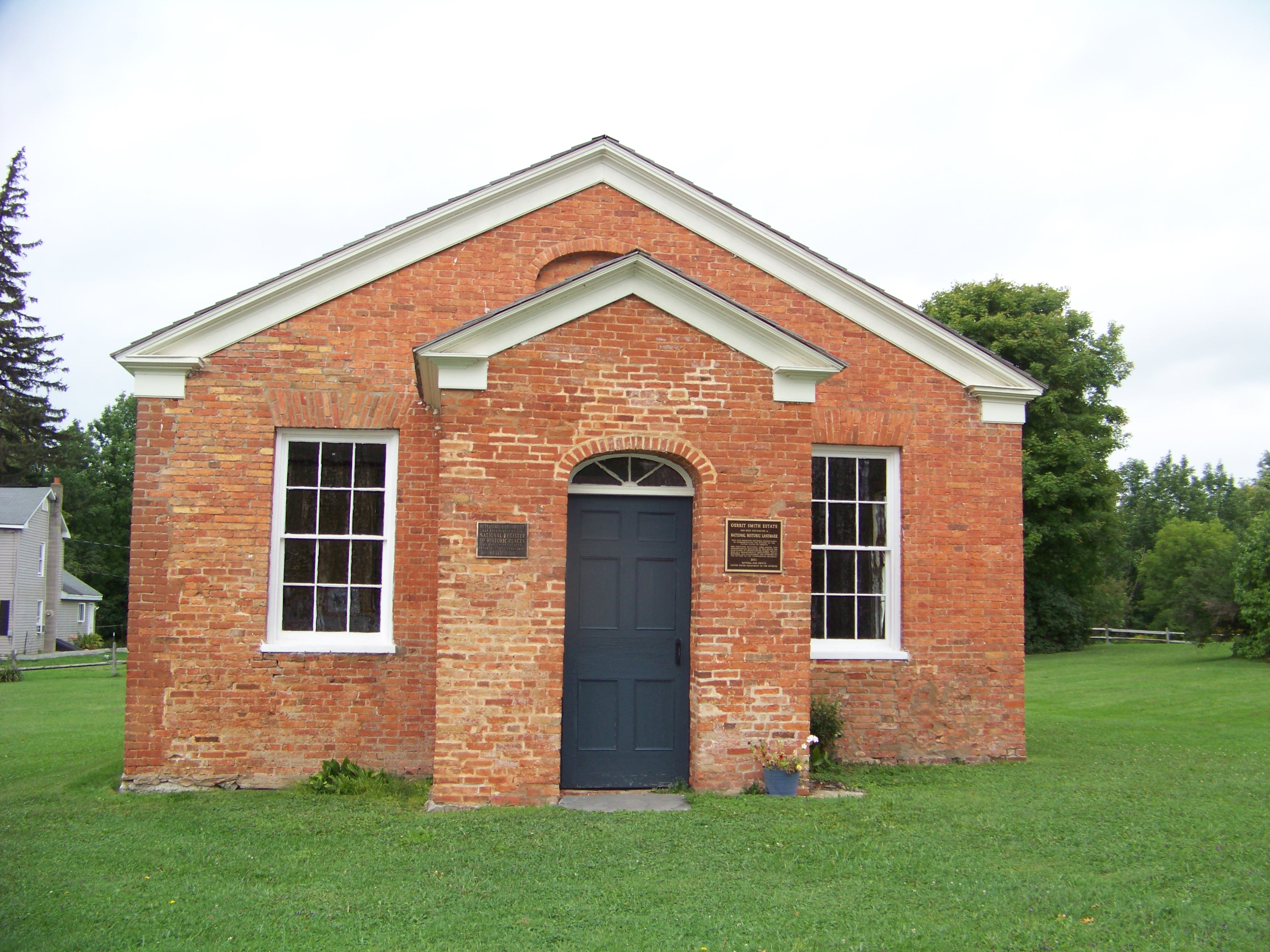

- Location within New York Location within the United States
- Location: Peterboro, New York
- Coordinates: 42°58′3″N 75°41′14″W
- Area: 0.1 acres (0.040 ha)
- Built: 1804
- Architectural style: Federal
- Part of: Gerrit Smith Estate (ID97001386)
- NRHP reference No.: 84002498

Significant dates
- Added to NRHP: September 7, 1984
- Designated NHLDCP: January 30, 2001

The Peterboro Land Office is located in the hamlet of Peterboro, in the Town of Smithfield in Madison County, New York. The small, Federal style building was built in 1804. It was constructed of locally produced brick laid in Flemish bond on the facade and common bond elsewhere. The main room is 24 by 28 feet (7.3 by 8.5 m). The interior has plaster walls and ceiling and a brick over plank floor. The entrance vestibule is in the center of the south wall between two windows. There is a window each on the east and west walls. The north walls has built in shelves and drawers on the east side and a 4-foot-high (1.2 m) iron vault door on the west side.

Peter Smith arrived in Utica, New York, then called Fort Schuyler, in 1784, and over the next ten years formed close ties with the local Native American tribe, the Oneidas. In 1794, Peter Smith leased, and subsequently acquired full title to, 50,000 acres (20,000 ha) of land from the Oneidas under Chief Skenadoah. The tract comprised the central portion of modern-day Madison County and parts of the current Oneida County. Over 100,000 acres (40,000 ha) of land in the northeastern part of the country were transferred in thousands of transactions at the land office, which was used for that purpose until the late 19th century.

Gerrit Smith, Peter's son, continued in the land business after his father. He also established the Peterboro Academy in 1853 and an orphanage in 1871. He was an active abolitionist. His grandson, Gerrit Smith Miller, was a noted philanthropist and active in the women's suffrage movement.

The land office was listed on the National Register of Historic Places in 1984, and is part of the larger Gerrit Smith Estate which was designated a National Historic Landmark in 2001.

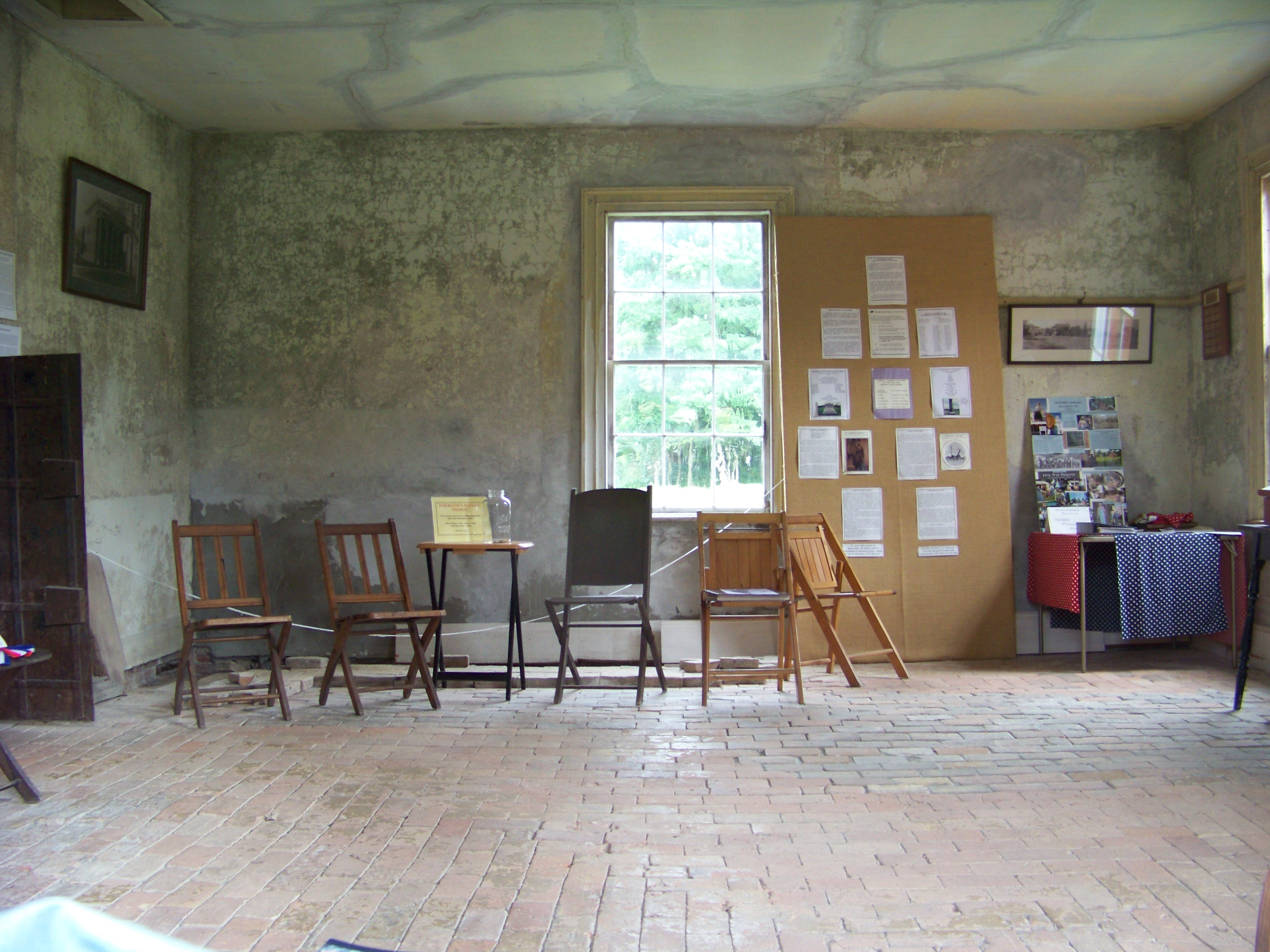
West wall

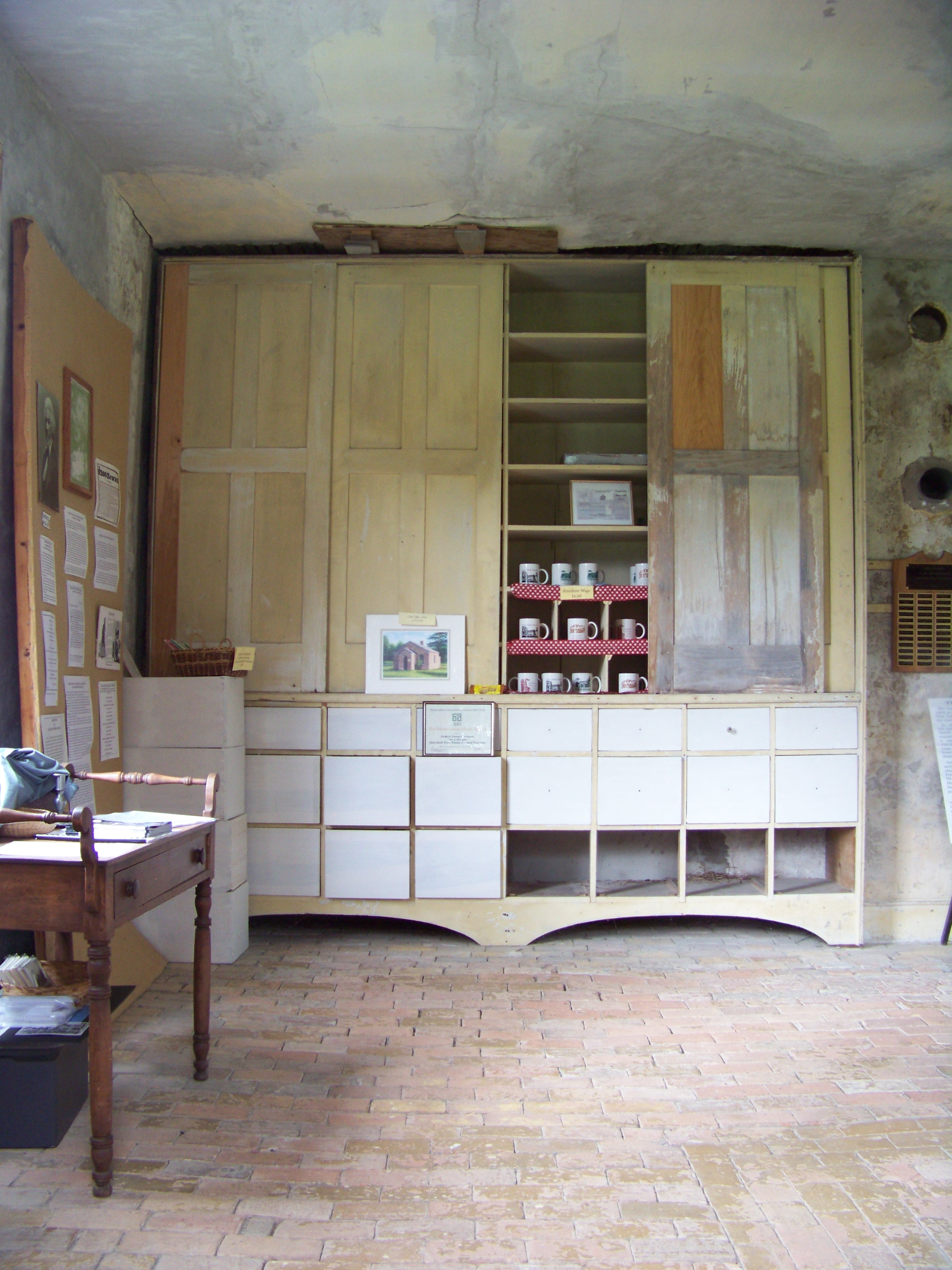
Built in shelves and drawers for land transaction ledgers on north wall

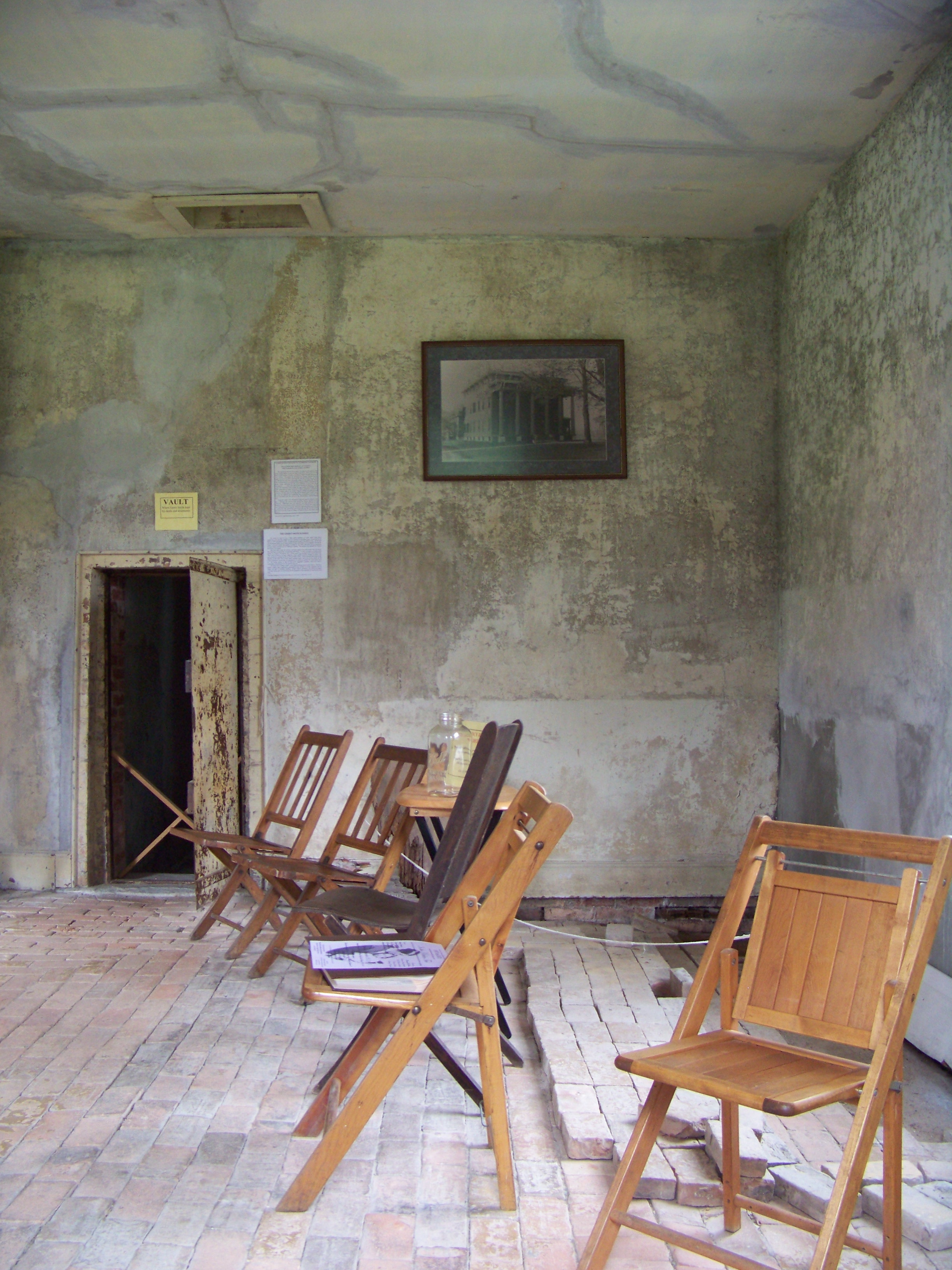
Vault door on east side of north wall

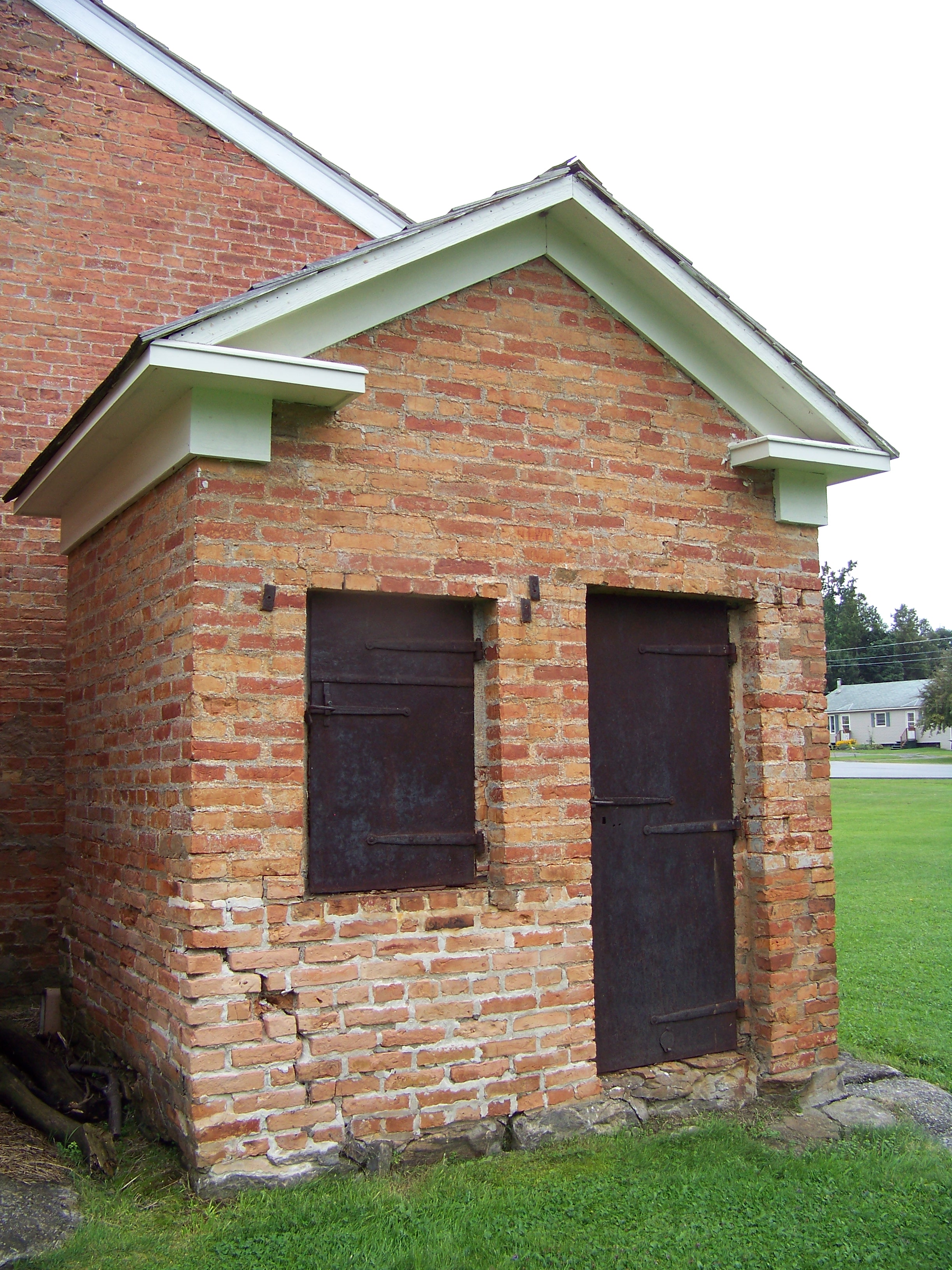
Smokehouse on west side of north wall of the land office
