= 1840 abolitionist presidential nominating convention =

U.S. political convention

1840 Liberty National Convention
- 1840 presidential election
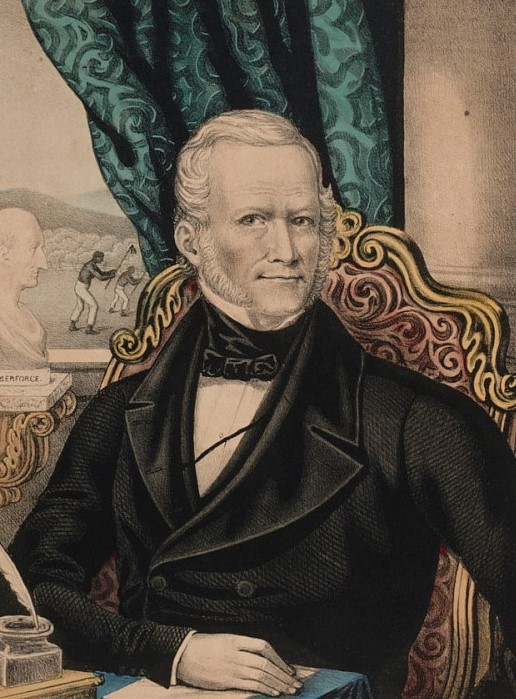
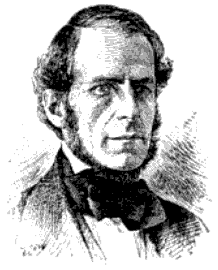
- Nominees; Birney and Earle

Convention
- Date(s): April 1–2, 1840
- City: Albany, New York
- Venue: Albany City Hall
- Chair: Alvan Stewart

Candidates
- Presidential nominee: James G. Birney of New York
- Vice-presidential nominee: Thomas Earle of Pennsylvania

Abolitionists held a presidential nominating convention on April 1 and 2, 1840, at the City Hall in Albany, New York, and nominated James G. Birney of New York for president and Thomas Earle of Pennsylvania for vice president in the 1840 United States presidential election. Although the name was not in general use at the time, this is considered the founding convention of the Liberty Party.

Delegates from six states attended the convention, which was preceded by local abolitionist meetings in the burned-over district of Upstate New York. New Yorkers accounted for all but a handful of those present, while the remainder came chiefly from New England. Winter weather and lack of funds precluded the attendance of delegates from Pennsylvania and the Old Northwest. Garrisonian abolitionists opposed any involvement in electoral politics and attended with the aim to prevent an independent nomination.

Robust debate between the Garrisonians and the political abolitionists preceded the voting on the second day of the convention. The motion to nominate candidates for president and vice president narrowly passed, and the convention named Birney and Earle as the national ticket. The convention did not specify a name for the new party, and Birney and Earle were known variously as the Abolitionist, Freemen's, Human Rights, Liberty, and People's ticket. The pair polled 0.3 percent of the vote in the fall election, which was won by the Whig candidate, William Henry Harrison.

== Origins ==
=== Political abolitionism ===
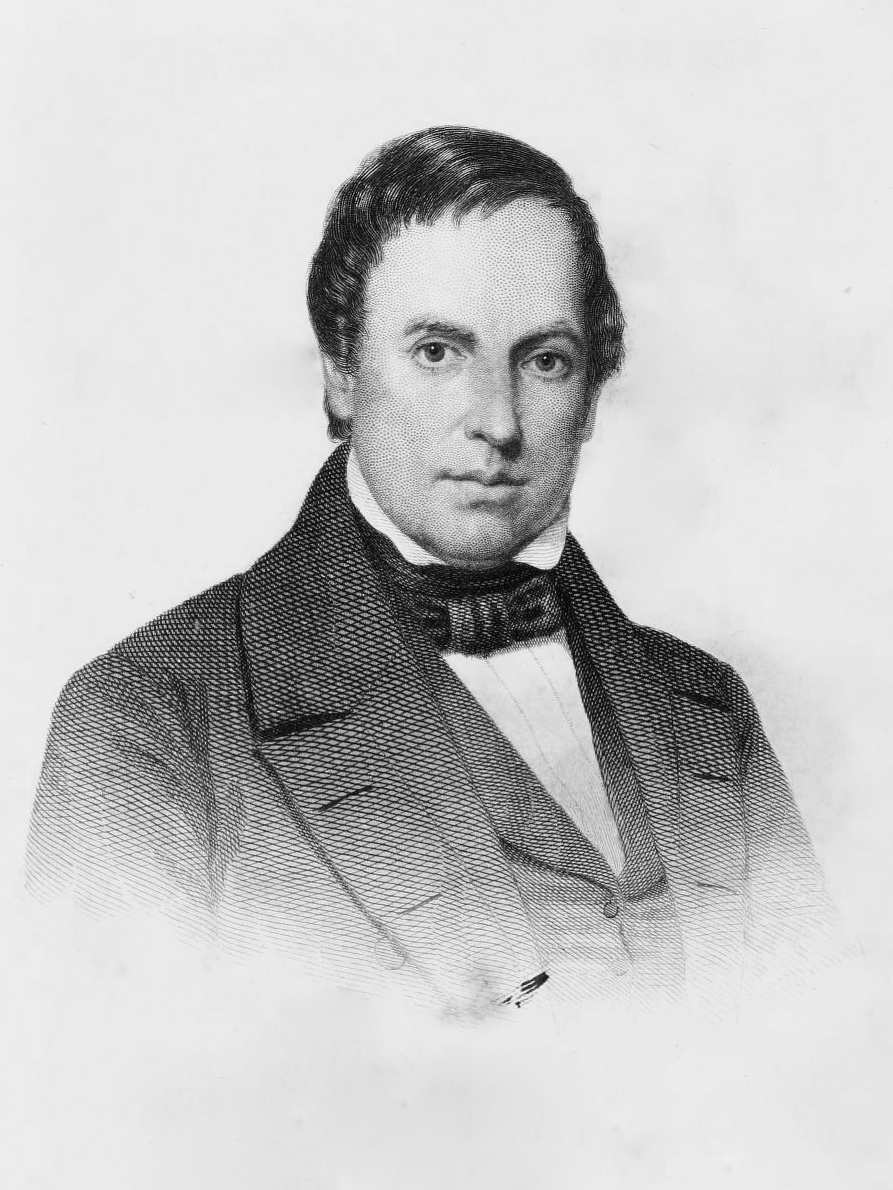
Alvan Stewart, early political abolitionist who served as president of the Albany convention

Abolitionists debated their stance on electoralism during the 1830s, with a minority favoring creation of a new abolitionist party. Alvan Stewart and Myron Holley emerged as the most prominent political abolitionists. The need for political action was evident from the failure of existing institutions to respond to moral suasion.

Initially, most abolitionists preferred to work within the established two-party system. By 1839, efforts to influence the Democratic and Whig parties had apparently failed. Adherents to the philosophy of nonresistance opposed participation in the electoral system as a moral and religious principle. Many abolitionists believed that political parties were essentially corrupt and warned that a descent into partisanship would undermine the movement's moral message.

Interest in an independent abolitionist party increased following the 1839 Whig National Convention in response to the nominations of William Henry Harrison and John Tyler, both slaveholders, as the national Whig candidates. Holley travelled across Upstate New York tirelessly advocating for independent nominations in the fall of 1839. Other prominent abolitionists became converts to the necessity of independent nominations, including Joshua Leavitt, Gerrit Smith, Elizur Wright, John Greenleaf Whittier, Austin Willey, and William Goodell, although the timing and form of the nominations—whether an independent candidacy or the base for a permanent party organization—remained controversial.

=== Warsaw convention ===
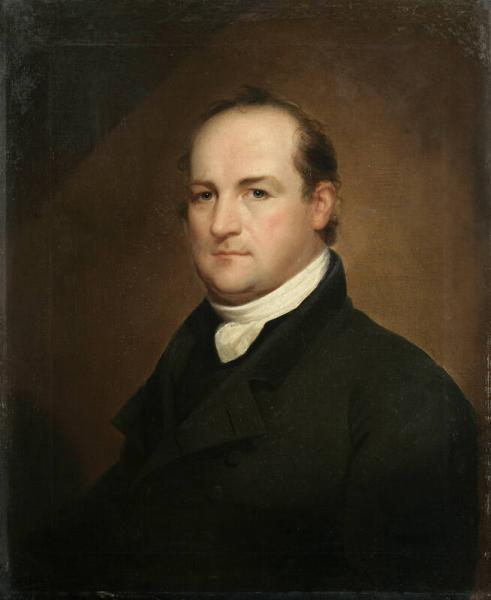
Myron Holley, organizer of the Warsaw and Arcade conventions

The New York State Anti-Slavery Society held a convention at the Presbyterian church in Warsaw, New York, on November 13 and 14, 1839. The more than 500 attendees included abolitionists from Western New York and neighboring Pennsylvania. Josiah Andrews of Perry, New York, presided over the meeting, while Holley and William L. Chaplin served on the five-member committee on resolutions. Most of the measures reported by the committee passed unanimously, but the third resolution declaring "that the elector who votes for a candidate for the state or national legislature not known to be the decided advocate of impartial freedom [...] is no less criminal than he would be, if in the primary assemblies he should vote directly against freedom, and in favor of oppressive, cruel and chattelizing laws," was adopted in a contested vote, 22 to 12. The sixth resolution endorsing the creation of a new abolitionist party was adopted unanimously. The convention nominated Birney for president and Francis Julius LeMoyne of Pennsylvania for vice president, and appointed Holley, Andrews, and Joshua H. Darling to prepare an address to the electorate.

Both Birney and LeMoyne declined the nomination of the Warsaw convention. LeMoyne felt an independent ticket was untimely and inexpedient, and warned that the action of the convention suggested a worrying lack of confidence in the moral influence of abolitionism. Birney approved the principle of independent nominations, but felt the Warsaw convention was not an appropriate venue, and that a candidate should be selected by a national gathering of abolitionists. His conditional refusal set in motion the chain of events that would culminate in the first national convention of the unnamed new abolitionist party the following year.

=== Arcade convention ===
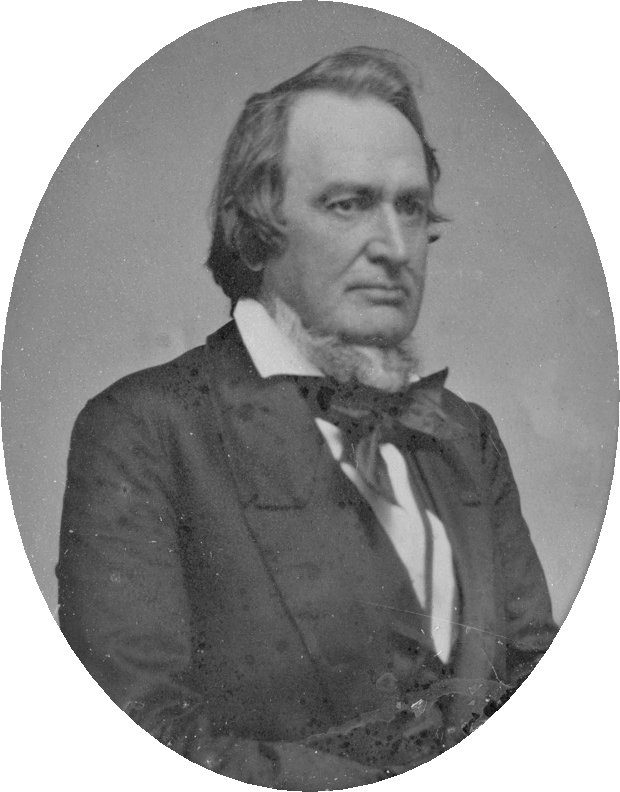
Gerrit Smith, wealthy philanthropist and abolitionist from Peterboro, New York

A gathering of between 600 and 700 abolitionists from the vicinity of Genesee County, New York, met at Arcade, New York, on January 28 and 29, 1840. Holley and Gerrit Smith were the principal organizers of this meeting. Reuben Sleeper was president of the convention. The delegates met in a temporary structure constructed for the purpose, the village meeting house having been found too small to admit the crowds that flocked from as far away as 60 miles in all directions.

Holley, Smith, and Chaplin led the political abolitionists on the floor of the convention. A large number of antislavery Whigs attended in order to oppose the formation of a new abolitionist party, but were outvoted three to one by the advocates of independent nominations. The resolutions adopted by the convention denounced the Harrison-Tyler ticket and the Democratic incumbent president Martin Van Buren and endorsed the creation of a new abolitionist party. The delegates called for a national convention of the "friends of the immediate abolition of slavery" to meet at Albany on April 1 to nominate candidates for president and vice president.

The action of the Arcade convention elicited a flurry of controversy. William Lloyd Garrison denounced the gathering in the pages of The Liberator and mocked the attendees as a handful of fringe "malcontents" claiming to speak for the national abolitionist movement. Smith and Amos A. Phelps defended political abolitionists against charges of inconsistency and moral laxity, responding that the intransigence of the existing parties created a religious obligation for abolitionists to act independently. Phelps argued that it was the moral character of politicians, not politics, that led to corruption, and that a new party would invite the participation of Christians alienated by the opportunism of the Whigs and Democrats. Goodell expressed strong reservations against permanent political parties, and called instead for a temporary, single-issue "union" to contest the 1840 election.

== Candidates ==
=== Birney ===
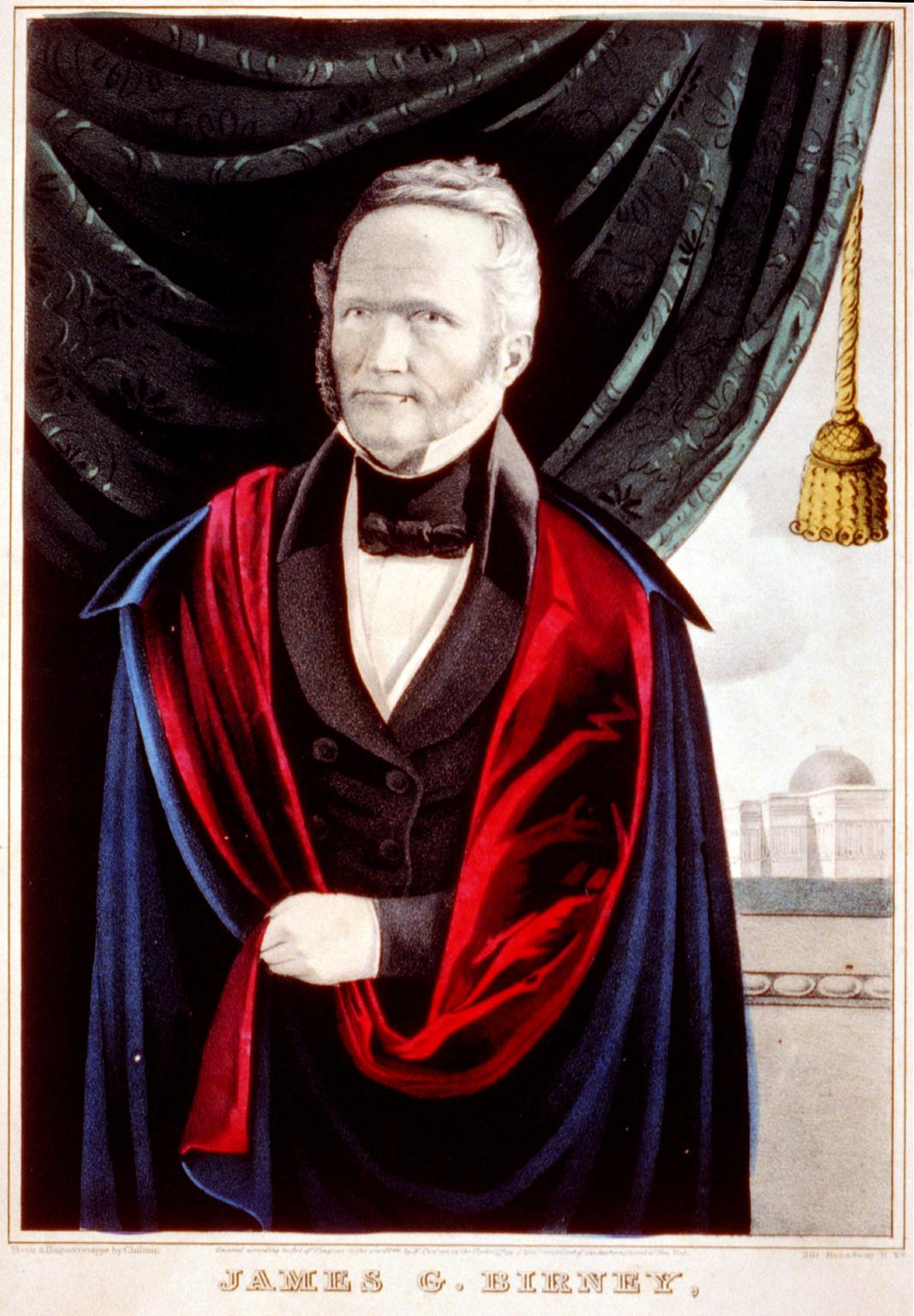
James G. Birney, twice nominated for president by abolitionists in 1840 and 1844

James Gillespie Birney was born in 1792 to a slaveholding Kentucky family. A graduate of Princeton University, he was admitted to the bar and served as a member of both the Kentucky and Alabama legislatures during the 1810s. He was an early supporter of the American Colonization Society, which advocated for gradual emancipation and the resettlement of free people of color outside the United States. In 1836, he became a convert to immediatism, manumitted the enslaved people on his Alabama plantation, and relocated to Cincinnati, where he served as the editor of the Philanthropist and an officer in the American Anti-Slavery Society (AASS).

Birney opposed independent political action by abolitionists as late as 1838, but by 1839 had become one of the most prominent advocates for a new party. He became aligned with the Anti-Garrisonian faction in the AASS and notably broke with Garrison over the equal participation of women in the society's activities, which Garrison supported and Birney opposed. Following his conditional reply to the Warsaw convention, which stressed the timing and venue of the nominations, he appeared likely to receive the nomination of the Albany convention when it met in April 1840.

Birney's candidacy was met with reluctance from some political abolitionists, including Leavitt, Wright, and Smith, who preferred a better-known candidate to head the new party's ticket in the fall campaign. When it appeared that no other prominent abolitionist would agree to run, some, including Whittier and Henry B. Stanton, advised postponing the efforts to organize a new party until after the next election.

=== LeMoyne ===
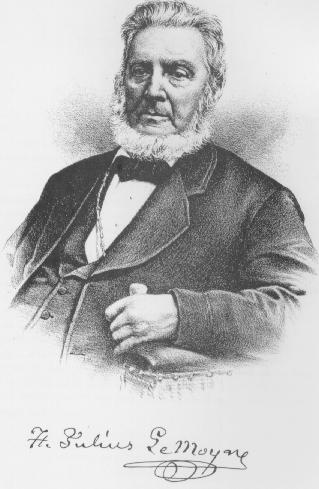
Francis Julius LeMoyne declined the vice presidential nomination of the Warsaw convention.

Francis Julius LeMoyne was born in Pennsylvania in 1798. He graduated from Washington College in 1815 and later attended Jefferson Medical College. A wealthy physician notable for his diverse intellectual pursuits, LeMoyne was active in the abolitionist movement in his native state, serving as an agent of the Underground Railroad and as president of the Pennsylvania Anti-Slavery Society. Following the schism of the AASS in May 1840, he served as vice president of the American and Foreign Anti-Slavery Society.

LeMoyne opposed the creation of a new party ahead of the 1840 United States elections, which he believed was both premature and dangerously divisive. He declined the vice presidential nomination of the Warsaw convention when it was offered in November 1839. In his public reply to the convention, LeMoyne expressed concern that independent nominations would undermine abolitionists' religious message and implied their inability to abolish slavery through moral influence. Equally seriously, a poor showing in the presidential election would embarrass the abolitionist candidates and expose the movement's internal disunity to public ridicule. LeMoyne wrote to Birney that an independent candidacy could permanently alienate Whig and Democratic partisans from the abolitionist movement by forcing them to choose between their antislavery and partisan loyalties. "If our people perpetrate a pro Slavery vote, over the head of a worthy and consistent anti Slavery ticket," he predicted, "their backsliding will be so gross, that they may not be expected ever to return to the faith." He repeated his refusal in March 1840 as delegates prepared to travel to Albany for the national convention of the yet-unnamed party.

=== Earle ===
Thomas Earle was born in Leicester, Massachusetts, in 1789 and attended Leicester Academy. He moved to Philadelphia in 1817, where he was known as a lawyer, a Jacksonian Democrat, and a Hicksite Quaker. He joined the Pennsylvania Abolition Society during the 1820s and became an officer in the AASS. Earle's support for Black suffrage at the 1837–38 Pennsylvania constitutional convention led to his expulsion from the Pennsylvania Democratic Party. He joined the movement for an abolitionist political party, a stance which placed him at odds with the Garrisonian leadership of the AASS. Following LeMoyne's response to the Warsaw convention, Earle's past Democratic affiliation and his residence in an important swing state made him an attractive candidate for the abolitionist vice-presidential nomination.

== Convention ==
=== Debate ===
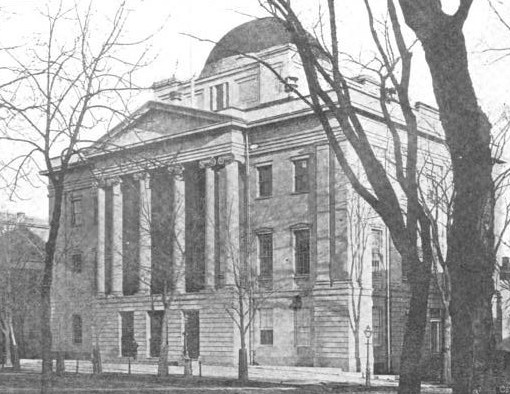
Albany City Hall, site of the first national convention of the yet-unnamed abolitionist party.

The convention met at the Albany City Hall on April 1, 1840. Alvan Stewart presided. Of the 121 delegates, 104 came from New York alone; Massachusetts sent the next-largest delegation, with 11 delegates. Winter weather and insufficient funds prevented the attendance of delegates from outside the Northeastern United States. Several prominent abolitionists who were unable to be present sent letters to be read to the convention, including Whittier, who advised against independent nominations. Included among the attendees were several who came with the express purpose of opposing a new abolitionist party. Of the new party advocates, Smith was bedridden and unable to travel to Albany, while Birney, as the prospective candidate, was tactfully absent.

Most of the discussion during the two days of the convention focused on whether to support an independent ticket in the 1840 presidential election, with passionate arguments on both sides. The Reverend Nathan S. S. Beman gave a powerful speech ridiculing the new party movement. So persuasive were Beman's arguments that Wright predicted, if the delegates had been polled immediately following his remarks, a majority would have voted against the measure.

Holley, Leavitt, Stewart, Beriah Green, and Benjamin Shaw (who traveled 90 miles on foot from his Vermont residence to attend the convention) spoke in favor of independent nominations. Holley spoke immediately after Beman and responded to him directly, arguing for the necessity of a new party; only by independent political action could abolitionists increase their moral influence and demonstrate their consistent opposition to slavery. Stewart replied that the abolitionists' previous tactics had been ineffective, and only by organizing a new party could they break the hegemony of the Slave Power. A vote taken on the evening of the second day resulted in a narrow majority for independent nominations, with 44 votes in favor and 33 against, while more than a third of the delegates abstained. The delegates then proceeded to nominate Birney and Earle for president and vice president by acclamation.

=== Balloting ===
Motion to nominate independent candidates for president and vice president
Choice	Votes
Yes	44
No	33
Total	77
Majority	39
Not voting	44

=== Platform and organization ===
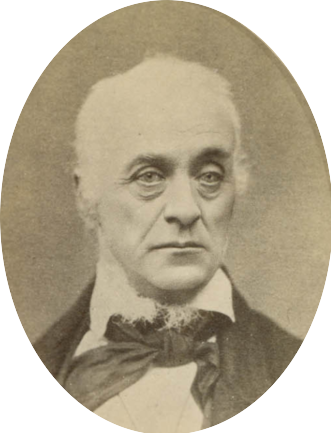
William Goodell opposed a new political party but served on the three-member national committee.

The convention deliberately avoided the controversial question of whether to form a permanent organization in order to preserve unity between advocates of a new party and those favoring nonpartisan nominations. A resolution written by Shaw and adopted unanimously by the delegates declared that "as abolitionists, it is our duty ... to rise above all party, and unite as philanthropists and Christians, to put down the slavocracy of all parties, and put up the principles of the Declaration of Independence at the ballot box." Continuing, the platform repudiated "party management" and "party proscription," calling instead for a "brotherly and conscientious union" of abolitionists in support of Birney's candidacy. In its eagerness to avoid even the slightest appearance of partisanship, the platform "at times seemed to deny that a party had been formed at all."

Similarly, eager to recruit as widely as possible, the convention avoided addressing other divisive topics in favor of a narrow emphasis on the abolition of slavery. The platform was deliberately silent on issues apart from slavery; in the event that Birney and Earle were elected, all other questions would be settled according to the greatest good to all citizens. It condemned as "treasonable" the congressional gag rule restricting the introduction of antislavery petitions and endorsed renewed moral and religious efforts to abolish slavery in tandem with political action.

The delegates did not specify a name for the new party, if a party it was. Birney and Earle were most frequently called the Abolitionist or Independent Abolitionist ticket, although a variety of other names were used, including the Human Rights Party, the People's Party, the Freemen's Party, and the Liberty Party. The last was the invention of Gerrit Smith, who used the name as early as February 1840, and was later formally adopted by the 1841 Liberty National Convention.

The convention appointed a national committee consisting of Stewart, Smith, and Goodell to coordinate the campaign. In response to criticism that a gathering dominated by New Yorkers was hardly a "national" convention, the delegates instructed the committee to hold a ratification meeting at New York City in one month's time.

== Aftermath ==
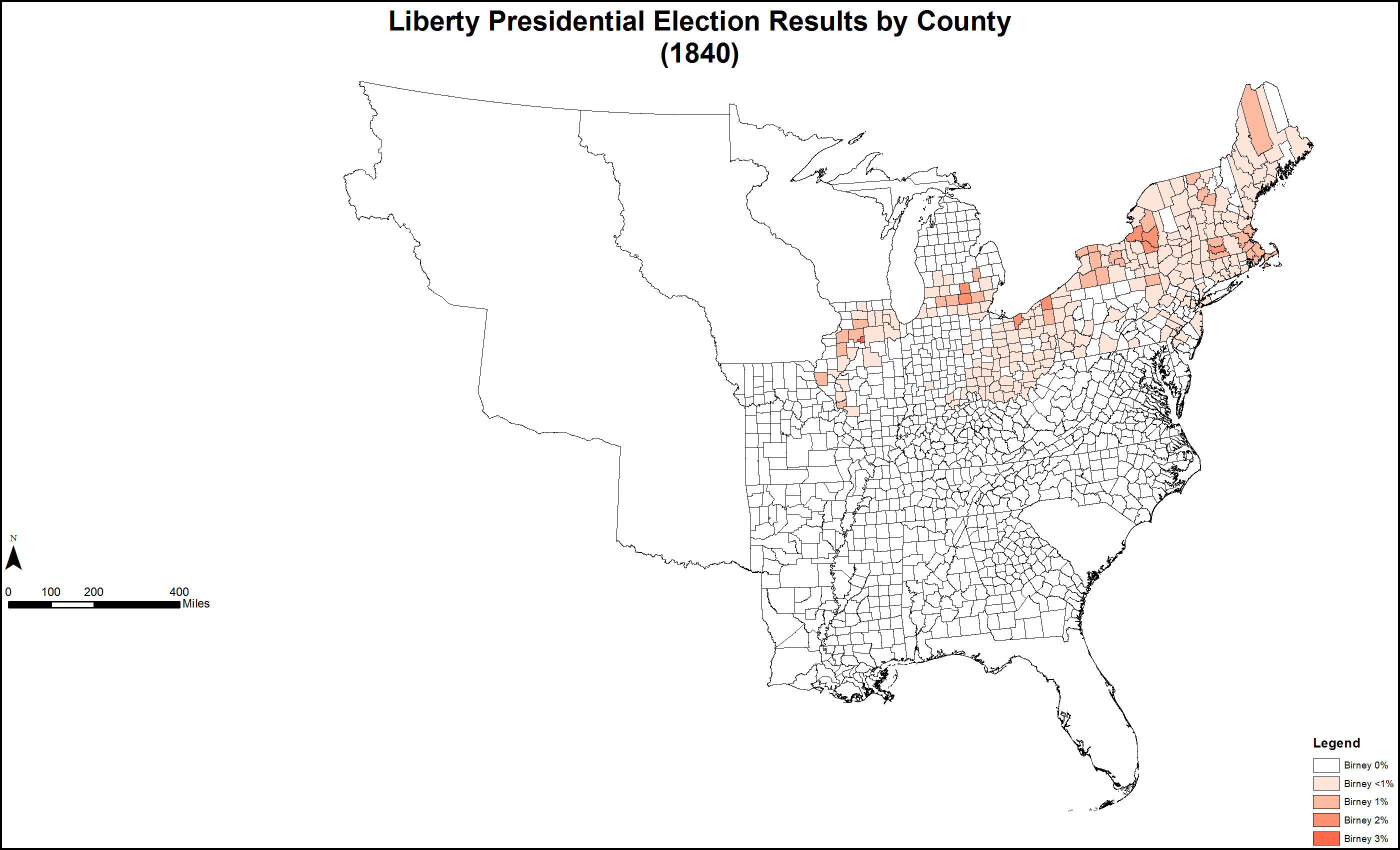
Map showing the share of the vote won by Birney and Earle in each county in the 1840 United States presidential election

Delegates from 10 of the 13 free states attended the ratification convention at New York City in May 1840, while many abolitionists were in town for the annual meeting of the American Anti-Slavery Society. The meeting was a landmark event in the history of the AASS, which split definitively when opponents of Garrison left to form the American and Foreign Anti-Slavery Society, leaving the Garrisonians in control of the Old Organization. Across town, the ratification convention confirmed the choice of Birney and Earle as the national ticket, as Birney prepared to set sail for London as part of the American delegation to the World Anti-Slavery Convention.

The convention received mixed responses from abolitionists. Garrisonians ridiculed the "April Fools' Convention" as ill-considered and unrepresentative of the national abolitionist movement. Garrison called the meeting a "ridiculous farce," and laughed that a gathering of delegates "not as large as a common village meeting" should have "the folly, the presumption, the almost unequalled infatuation, to put candidates in nomination in their behalf, for the Presidency and Vice Presidency of the United States!" Privately, Whittier and Gamaliel Bailey expressed strong reservations to Birney, and Bailey publicly criticized the Albany convention as premature. Leavitt, in contrast, gave Birney and Earle his unqualified endorsement and became the independent ticket's most enthusiastic supporter. Some early skeptics, including Whittier, eventually supported Birney after he formally accepted the nomination. Bailey finally endorsed Birney before the election, although many of his associates in Ohio supported the Whigs. Most outsiders took little notice of the nominations or dismissed the ticket as a Democratic ploy to divert abolitionist votes from the national Whig candidates.

Birney remained out of the country until after Election Day and played little part in the campaign. Few expected the ticket to draw a significant number of votes, least of all Birney himself, who saw his candidacy as a starting point for future efforts. Electors pledged to Birney and Earle appeared in every free state, where they polled a combined 6,946 votes. The ticket put up its strongest performances in Massachusetts and New York, which together accounted for more than half Birney's national total. In Connecticut, Indiana, and New Jersey, political abolitionists remained largely unorganized, and Birney polled only a negligible number of votes in these states. Altogether, Birney and Earle received 0.3 percent of the national popular vote and no electoral votes, finishing a distant third behind Harrison and Van Buren. Most abolitionists abstained or voted for the larger parties, while only in Massachusetts did Birney poll more than 1 percent of the votes cast.

Electoral results
Presidential candidate	Party	Home state	Popular vote		Electoral vote	Running mate		
Presidential candidate	Party	Home state	Count	Percentage	Electoral vote	Vice-presidential candidate	Home state	Electoral vote
William Henry Harrison	Whig	Ohio	1,274,304	52.88%	234	John Tyler	Virginia	234
Martin Van Buren (incumbent)	Democratic	New York	1,128,348	46.83%	60	Richard Mentor Johnson (incumbent)	Kentucky	48
Martin Van Buren (incumbent)	Democratic	New York	1,128,348	46.83%	60	Littleton W. Tazewell	Virginia	11
Martin Van Buren (incumbent)	Democratic	New York	1,128,348	46.83%	60	James K. Polk	Tennessee	1
James G. Birney	Liberty	New York	6,946	0.29%	0	Thomas Earle	Pennsylvania	0
Total			2,409,598	100%	294			294
Needed to win					148			148

== Bibliography ==
- Birney, William (1890). James G. Birney and His Times. New York: D. Appleton and Company.
- Brooks, Corey M. (2016). Liberty Power: Antislavery Third Parties and the Transformation of American Politics. Chicago: University of Chicago Press. ISBN 978-0-226-30728-2.
- Dubin, Michael J. (2002). United States Presidential Elections, 1788-1860. Jefferson, NC: McFarland & Co. ISBN 978-0-7864-6422-7.
- Johnson, Reinhard O. (2009). The Liberty Party 1840–1848: Antislavery Third Party Politics in the United States. Baton Rouge: Louisiana State University Press. ISBN 978-0-8071-3393-4.
- Perry, Lewis (1973). Radical Abolitionism: Anarchy and the Government of God in Antislavery Thought. Ithaca, NY: Cornell University Press. ISBN 0-8014-0754-0.
- Sewell, Richard H. (1976). Ballots for Freedom: Antislavery Politics in the United States, 1837–1860. New York: Oxford University Press. LCCN 75-25464.
- Wood, Nicholas (Spring 2011). "'A Sacrifice on the Altar of Slavery': Doughface Politics and Black Disenfranchisement in Pennsylvania, 1837—1838". Journal of the Early Republic. 31 (1): 75–106.
- Young, Andrew W. (1869). History of the Town of Warsaw, New York, [...]. Buffalo, NY.
