= National Abolition Hall of Fame and Museum =

Historic church in New York, United States

- Smithfield Presbyterian Church
- U.S. National Register of Historic Places
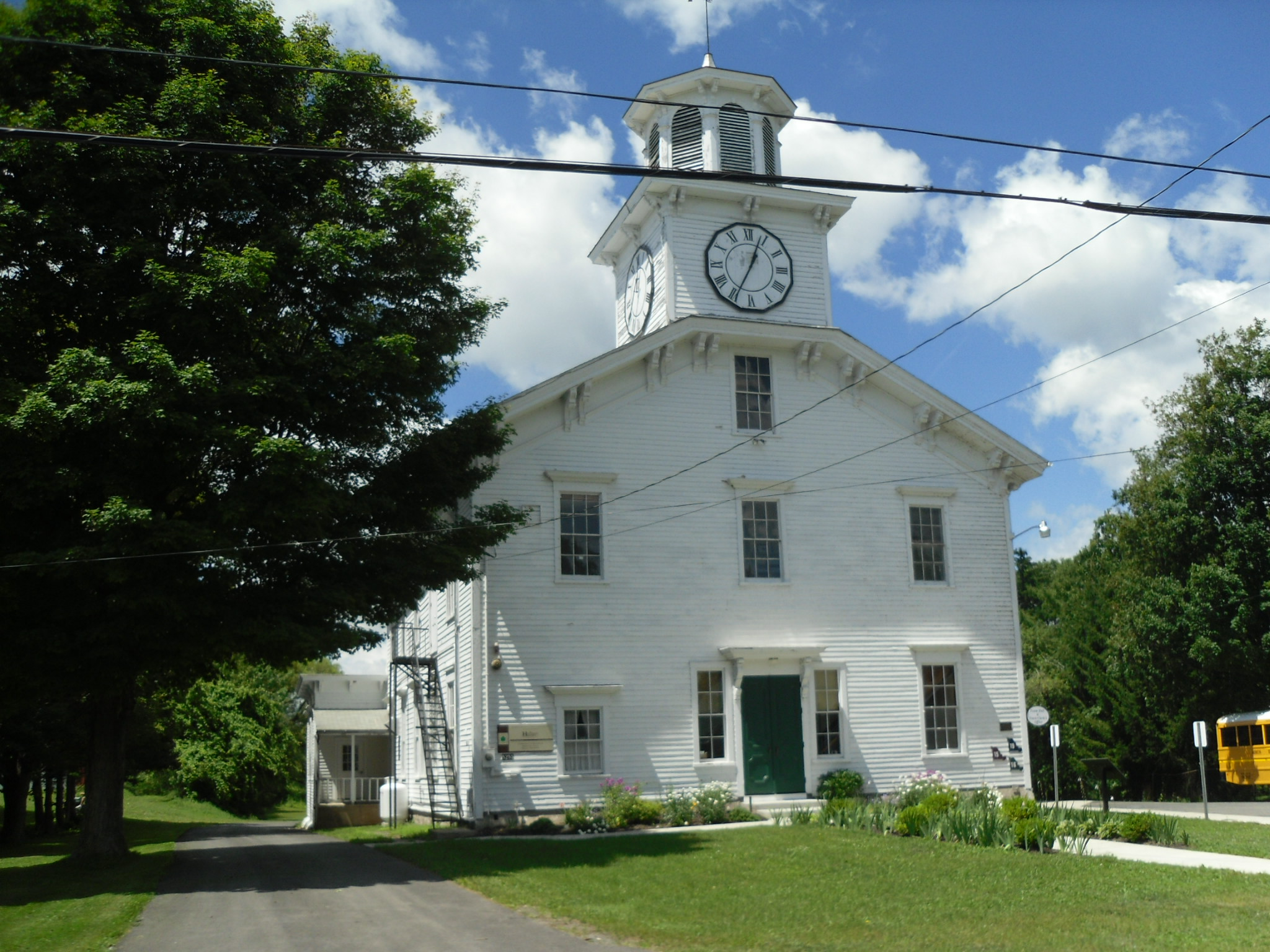
- Smithfield Presbyterian Church, July 2010

- Location within New York Location within the United States
- Location: Pleasant Valley Rd. between Elizabeth and Park Sts., Peterboro, New York
- Coordinates: 42°57′56″N 75°41′17″W
- Area: less than one acre
- Built: 1820
- Architectural style: Italianate, Federal
- NRHP reference No.: 94001370
- Added to NRHP: December 12, 1994

The National Abolition Hall of Fame and Museum is a museum located in Peterboro, New York, that honors American abolitionists by showcasing their work to end slavery, and the legacy of their struggle: the drive to end racism.

== Museum ==
The museum is located at 5255 Pleasant Valley Road, between Elizabeth and Park Streets, in the hamlet of Peterboro, New York. Specifically, the museum can be found on the second floor of a historic Presbyterian church. The church, which was built in 1820, was listed on the National Register of Historic Places in 1994. Although it has not been used as a church since 1870, it has housed the Evans Academy, the Peterboro Union School, and the Peterboro Elementary School since then. The Town Hall of the Town of Smithfield can now be found in the first floor, with the town clerk's office (note the small sign at right of building).

Most notably, the museum is located in the same building in which the inaugural meeting of the New York State Anti-Slavery Society was held in 1835. The original meeting, which was located in Utica, was aborted by pro-slavery protestors, including the New York Senator, and the following year New York Attorney General, Samuel Beardsley. Gerrit Smith, a leading American social reformer, suggested Peterboro, New York as an alternate location.

The meeting was deemed "the largest convention ever assembled in that State for any purpose whatever", with 1,000 people in attendance.

== National Abolition Hall of Fame members ==
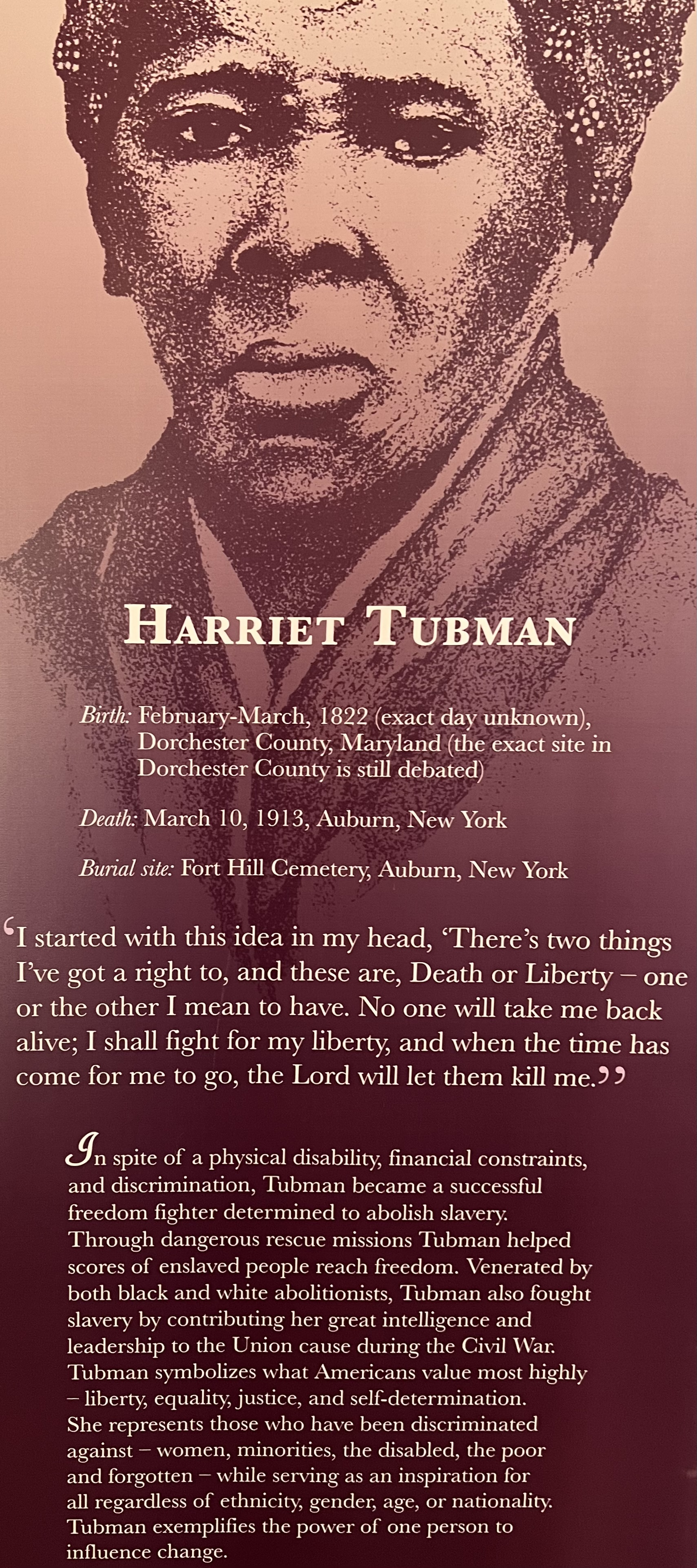
Harriet Tubman in the National Abolition Hall of Fame and Museum, Peterboro, NY

The following are the inductees of the National Abolition Hall of Fame as of 2022:

- 2005
  - Frederick Douglass
  - William Lloyd Garrison
  - Lucretia Mott
  - Gerrit Smith
  - Harriet Tubman
- 2007
  - John Brown
  - Lydia Maria Child
  - Wendell Phillips
  - Sojourner Truth
- 2009
  - Lewis Tappan
  - Theodore Dwight Weld
- 2011
  - Abby Kelley Foster
  - Jermain Wesley Loguen
  - George Gavin Ritchie (see Colgate Maroon-News#History)
- 2013
  - Elijah Parish Lovejoy
  - Myrtilla Miner
  - John Rankin
  - Jonathan Walker
- 2016
  - Rev. John Gregg Fee
  - Beriah Green
  - Angelina Grimké Weld
  - James W.C. Pennington
- 2018
  - Frances Ellen Watkins Harper
  - Laura Smith Haviland
  - Samuel Joseph May
- 2022
  - Robert Everett
  - Calvin Fairbank
  - Stephen Myers
