= Gerrit Smith Estate =

Historic house in New York, United States

- U.S. National Register of Historic Places
- U.S. National Historic Landmark
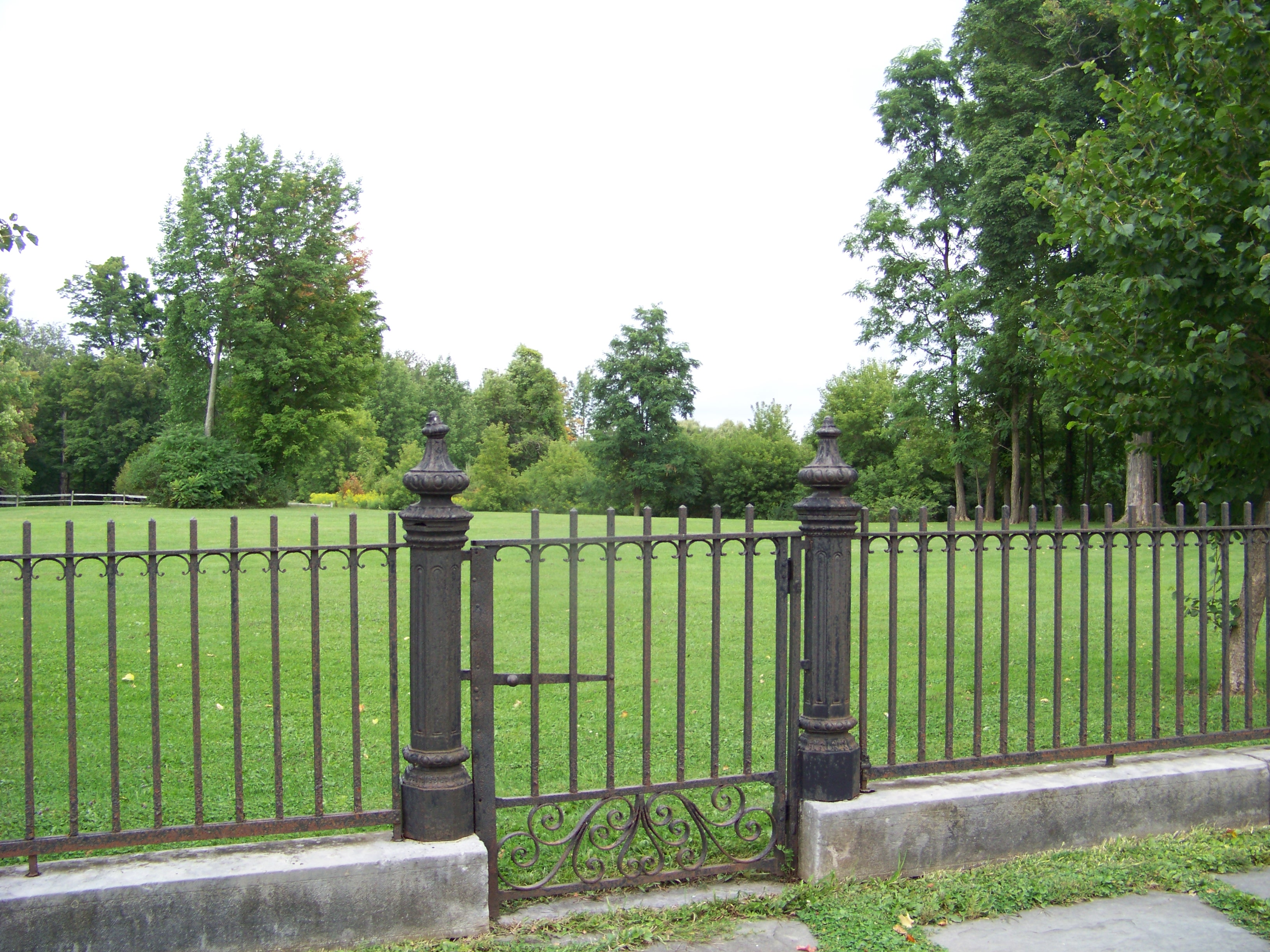

- Location within New York Location within the United States
- Location: 5304 Oxbow Rd., Peterboro, New York
- Coordinates: 42°58′3.53″N 75°41′13.52″W
- Area: 7.78 acres (3.15 ha)
- Architectural style: Mid 19th Century Revival, Federal
- NRHP reference No.: 97001386

Significant dates
- Added to NRHP: November 24, 1997
- Designated NHL: January 3, 2001

The Gerrit Smith Estate is a historic residential estate at Oxbow Road and Peterboro Road in Peterboro, New York. It was home to Gerrit Smith (1797–1874), a 19th-century social reformer, abolitionist, and presidential candidate, and his wife, Ann Carroll Fitzhugh. Smith established an early temperance hotel on his estate, and it was a widely known stop for escaped slaves on the Underground Railroad. The surviving elements of the estate were declared a National Historic Landmark in 2001. The estate is now managed by a nonprofit organization, and is open for tours from June to August.

== Description and history ==
The Gerrit Smith Estate is located on the west side of the hamlet of Peterboro, on about 8 acres (3.2 ha) of land (a remnant of what was once a 30-acre (12 ha) estate) bounded by Peterboro Road, Oxbow Road, and Oneida Brook. The estate was, in its heyday, a virtual village unto itself, with as many as 30 buildings, including the mansion house, secondary residences, and a hotel. The property is today much reduced: its Federal period mansion was destroyed by fire in the 1930s, the hotel had a short-lived existence (1827–1859) before it was torn down on Gerrit Smith's orders, and numerous other outbuildings have also been demolished or lost to decay.

The building was described as follows in 1875:

On my arrival at Peterboro I first saw Mr. Smith at his office—a plain and substantial full sized edifice for the purpose situated a few rods from his dwelling. Very soon he showed me the way to his stately mansion, and seated me in his library room, where Mrs. Smith was engaged in drawing. This is a very large room entered (from) the large hall and fronts Main Street—had an extensive library, but he remarked that he had found time to read but a few of the volumes it contained. He passed me around through the mansion containing many large and smaller rooms, some 12 ft. high in the lower story—all in good order and richly but plainly furnished. The wide piazzo on the southerly side of the house was converted into a large conservatory with a glass front and filled with choice flowers in great variety and heated in winter from a furnace in the basement of the mansion. After such examination Mr. Smith remarked that his father had built the mansion when he was a child and before settlements even made near it to any extent—said he had improved and added somewhat to it and feelingly remarked that he venerated it with the poplars that surrounded it as the work of his father. We were now called to dinner and when seated around the table Mr. Smith with much unction invoked God's blessing upon the poor slave and the dinner was served. After dinner he conducted me over the grounds attached to his mansion consisting of 25 A[cres] of land through which was flowing a never-failing stream of water of sufficient size to operate a mill just below the premises. A strong stone wall above high water mark extending along the sides of the stream protected the banks from the action of the water the summits of the banks being some 15 ft. above the walls. The ground was graded, forming an even gradual slope to the height of the walls. On the one side of the stream was a beautiful green lawn. On the other side were five terraces some 15 to 20 rods in length, rising each about 3 ft above the other to the summit. These terraces were planted with grapevines of several varieties all in a flourishing condition. At the end of the terraces was a large greenhouse or grapery made of glass at a cost of $4,000 in which the most choice foreign grapes were produced. Some ten rods in the rear of the mansion is a beautiful summer house, near which is a fine artificial fountain of living water. The whole grounds were in a state of high cultivation, abounding in fruit and ornamental trees and flowers, producing abundance of vegetables in great variety, melons, etc. The grounds were carefully laid out, with neat gravel walks passing in different directions with a design for convenience and ornament and they exhibited good taste.

The principal surviving buildings of historical significance that remain are the Peterboro Land Office with an attached smokehouse, designated on the National Register of Historic Places on its own, a 19th-century barn, and an adjacent building that was probably the laundry.

The estate was established by Peter Smith, one of Madison County's early white settlers, in the early 19th century. Smith acquired a large tract of land from the Oneida people, with whom he had previously engaged in the fur trade. From this estate, he managed vast holdings of real estate (over 700,000 acres (2,800 km^{2}) all over the state), and lent his name to both the hamlet of Peterboro and the encompassing township of Smithfield. Smith's son Gerrit took over this business in 1819, and eventually applied the family wealth to a wide variety of progressive causes. Principal among these were the abolition of slavery and the temperance movement. Smith attempted unsuccessfully to make Peterboro a dry community, opening what is believed to be the first temperance hotel in the nation on the estate. The hotel was ultimately a failure, and Smith razed it in the late 1850s. The estate was also widely known as a safe haven for escaped slaves making the trek to Canada on the Underground Railroad, and was a meeting place for suffragist organizations.

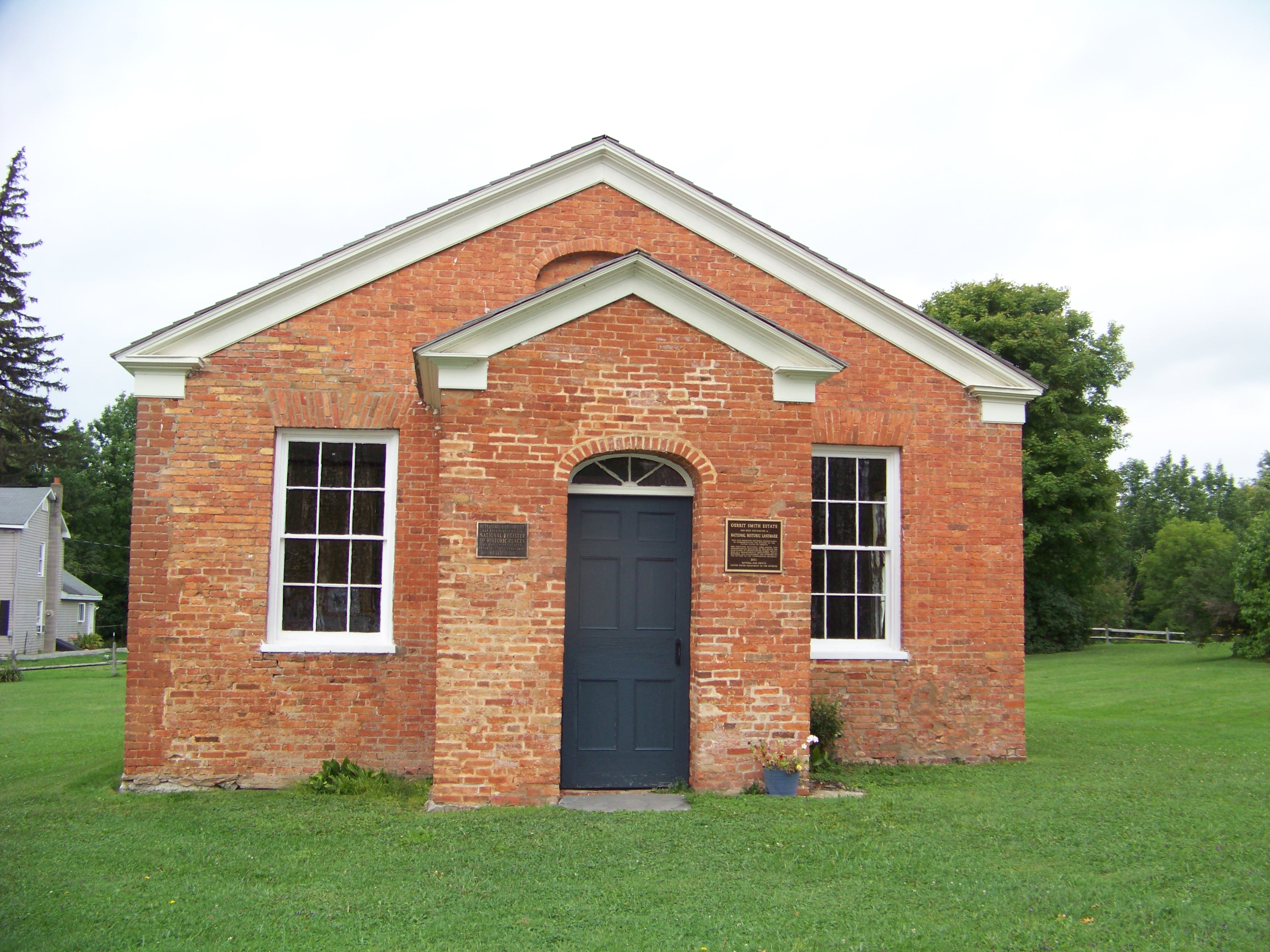
Peterboro Land Office

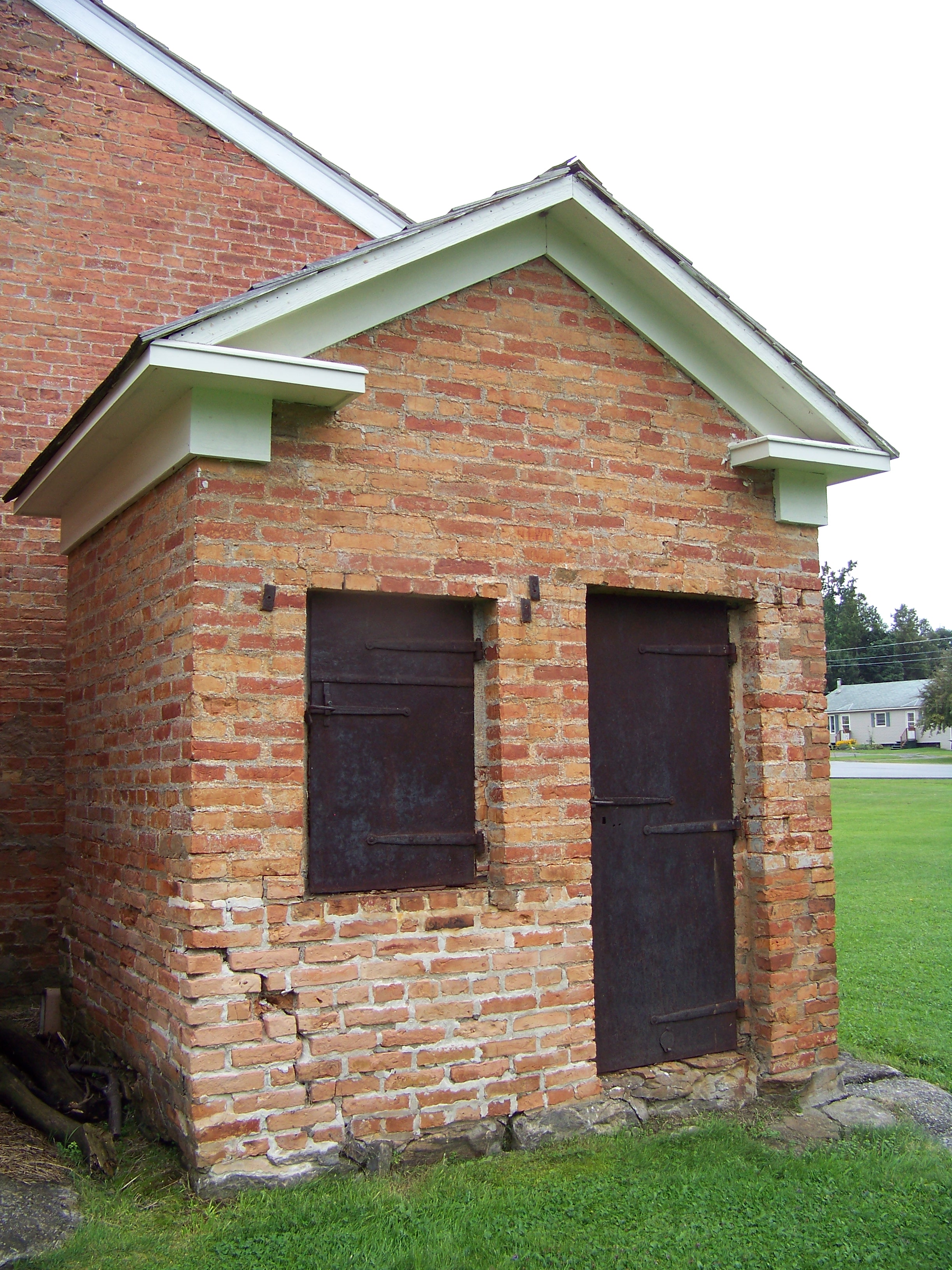
Smokehouse attached to the Peterboro Land Office

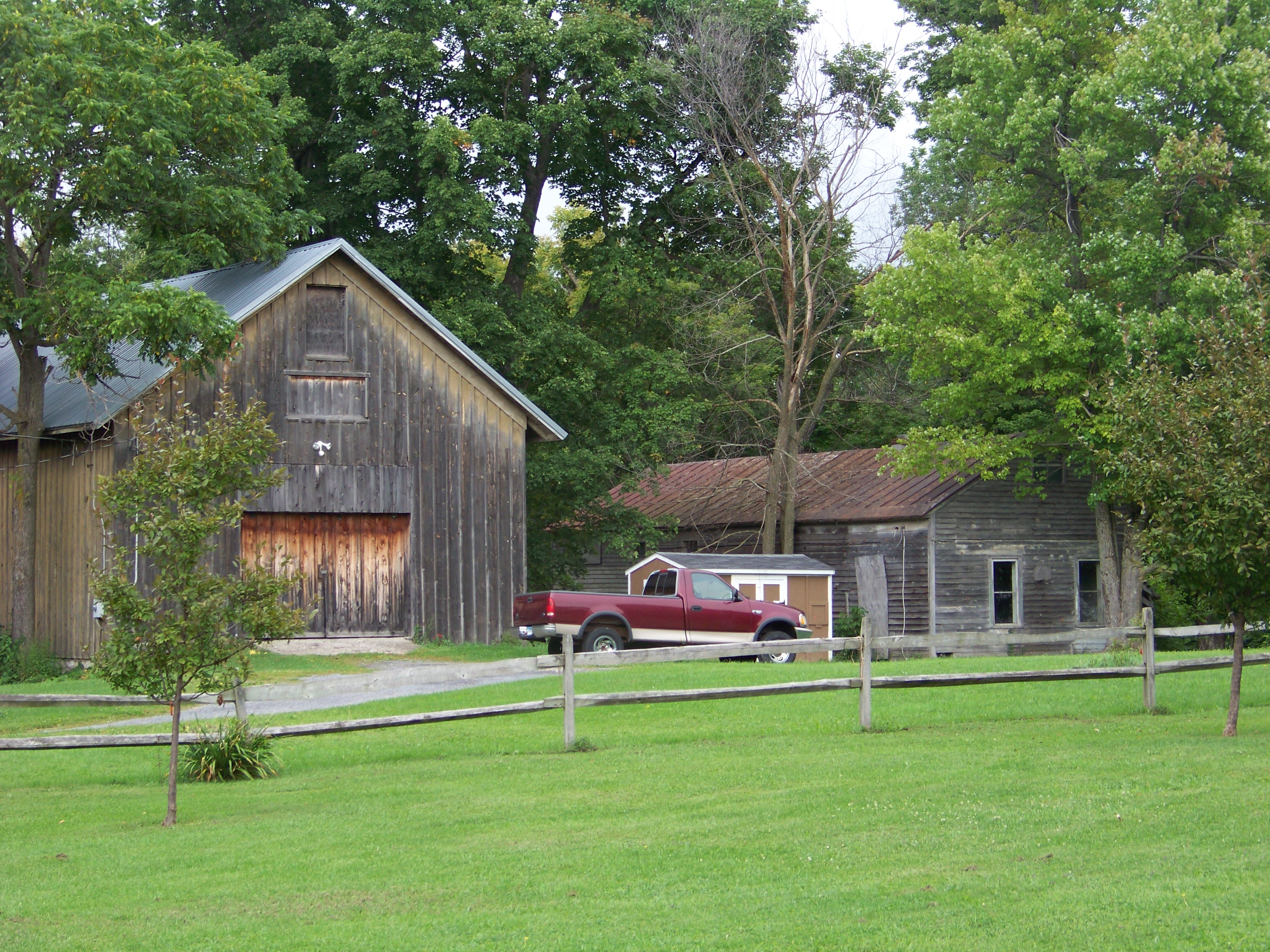
19th century barn and adjacent building thought to have been the laundry

== See also ==
- List of Underground Railroad sites
- List of National Historic Landmarks in New York
- National Register of Historic Places listings in Madison County, New York
