= Smithfield Presbyterian Church (Amenia, New York) =

Historic church in New York, United States

- U.S. National Register of Historic Places
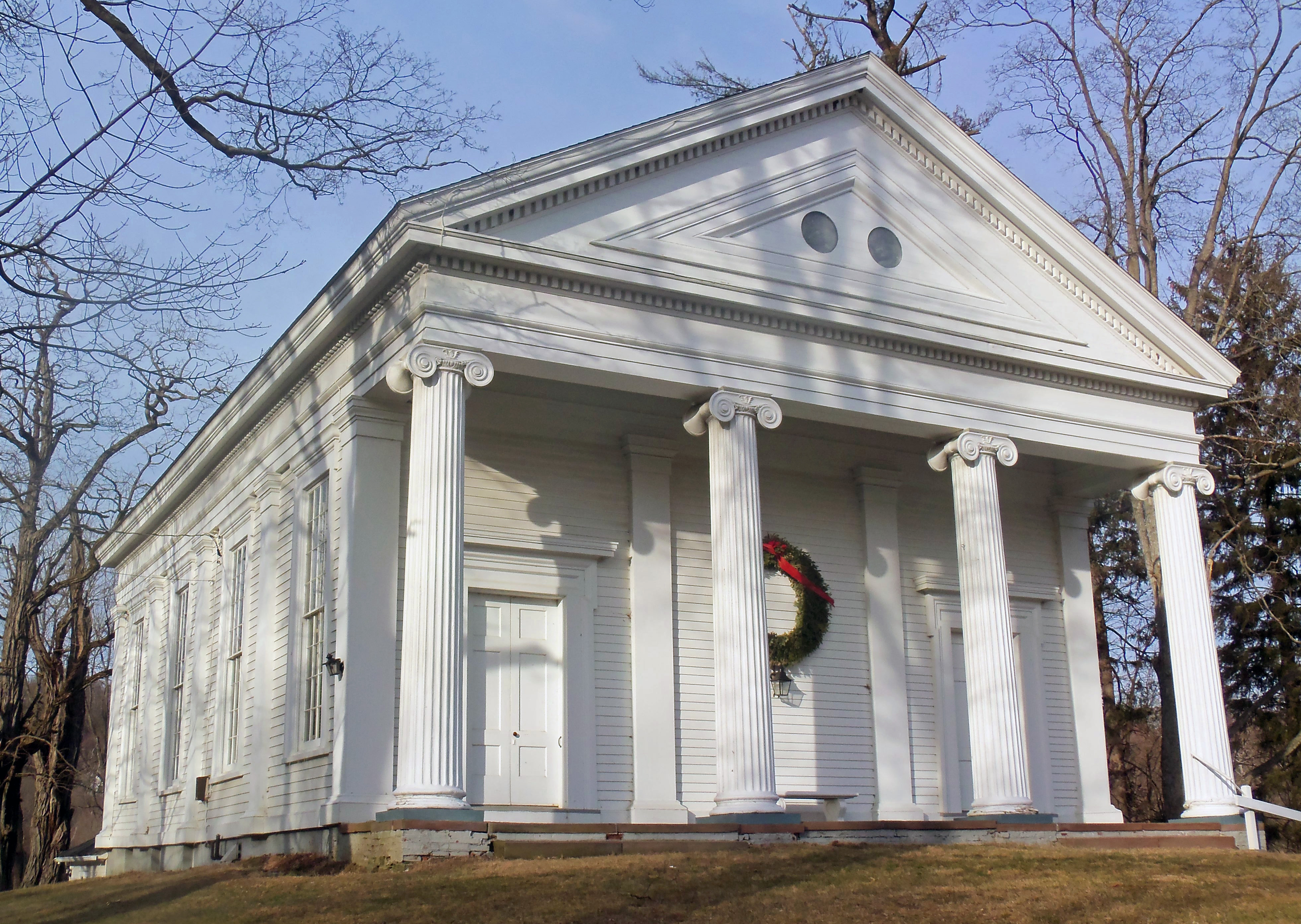
- Smithfield Presbyterian Church, January 2012

- Location within New York Location within the United States
- Location: 656 Smithfield Valley Rd., near Amenia, New York
- Coordinates: 41°53′09″N 73°36′00″W
- Area: 2.5 acres (1.0 ha)
- Built: 1737, c. 1847-1848, 1857, 1938
- Architect: Lockwood, Jonathan
- Architectural style: Greek Revival
- NRHP reference No.: 11001090
- Added to NRHP: February 3, 2012

Smithfield Presbyterian Church is a historic Presbyterian church located near Amenia, Dutchess County, New York. It was built about 1847–1848, and is a one-story, Greek Revival style heavy timber frame church sheathed in clapboard. It has a stone foundation and gable roof and features a tetrastyle portico supported by four Ionic order columns. The church was refurbished in 1938. Also on the property is a contributing horse shed, Sexton's House (1857), and church cemetery, with the earliest grave dated to 1737. George Whitefield (1714-1770) preached an open air revival sermon at the church in June 1770.

It was added to the National Register of Historic Places in 2012.

Smithfield is known for an 18th-century church (1742), a 19th-century building, a 20th-century liturgy, and a 21st-century theology. For over twenty years the church has welcomed the surrounding region to acoustic concerts with an active program of five per year sponsored by The Bang Family Concert Series, including two concerts annually by the Smithfield Chamber Orchestra.
