= New York State Anti-Slavery Society =

Utica Riot of 1835

The New York State Anti-Slavery Society was established on October 21, 1835, in Peterboro, New York. There were many prominent abolitionists at the meeting; it was held at the home of Gerrit Smith, an abolitionist and philanthropist, Alvan Stewart. who went on to become president of the society, and Beriah Green. Another very important member of the society was William Goodell. He even gathered $1,900 in donations by going all around the state of New York and giving lectures on the sin of slavery (and racism).

The group originally tried to meet in Utica, New York but was disrupted by an anti-abolitionist mob.This mob was made up of both local officials, and citizens. This disturbance is known as the Utica Riot of 1835. Despite this disruption, the group successfully convened in a meeting in Peterboro, New York, where they formally organized the society

The following year, in October 1836, the group held its first successful meeting in Utica, highlighting the resilience of the abolitionist movement in the face of violent opposition; the records of these proceedings were published and a copy is held in the Library of Congress.

The founding of the New York Anti-Slavery Society was a pivotal moment in the abolitionist movement in the United States. The early 1830s saw a surge in anti-slavery sentiment, with various societies and activists working to promote the abolition of slavery. The establishment of this society marked the growing organization and mobilization among the abolitionists, particularly in the northern states.

The violent opposition faced by the society in Utica highlighted the deep divisions within American society over the issue of slavery. The Utica Riot of 1835 was part of a recurring hostility toward abolitionists, reflecting the contentious nature of the slavery debate in the United States. This event drew national attention to the abolitionist cause and underscored the bravery and determination of its advocates.

Another significant instance of the slavery discussions was the Virginia Slavery Debate of 1831-32. This debate highlights the nationwide scope of the issue, showing that the abolitionist movement was a widespread topic across the entire country.

E. C. Pritchett, an ally of Theodore Weld, served as an agent and recording secretary for the society in 1840. His work helped document and organize the society's activities, contributing to its operational success.

The society reprinted William Jay's book on the federal government's protective relationship with slavery with a new appendix following the dispensation of the United States v. The Amistad.

== See also ==
- History of slavery in New York (state)
