= Gerrit Smith Miller =

American farmer and sportsman (1845–1937)

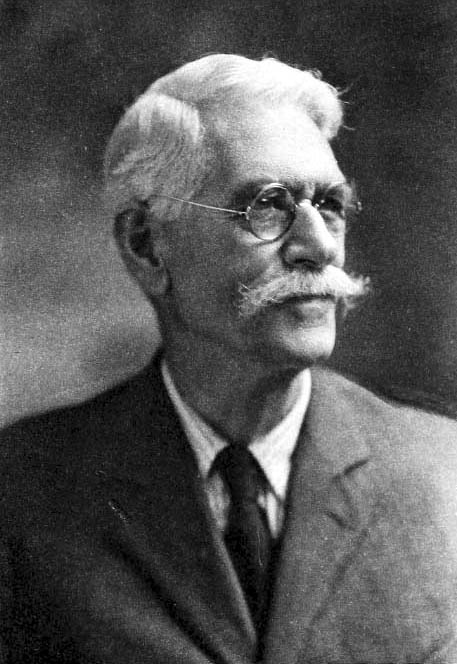
- Miller c. 1923
- Born: January 30, 1845; Peterboro, New York
- Died: March 10, 1937 (aged 92); Peterboro, New York
- Occupations: Dairy farmer and cattle breeder
- Known for: Founder and captain of Oneida Football Club
- Spouse: Susan Hunt Dixwell
- Children: Gerrit Smith Miller Jr. Basil Dixwell Miller
- Parents: Charles Dudley Miller (father); Elizabeth Smith Miller (mother)

Gerrit Smith Miller (January 30, 1845 – March 10, 1937), commonly called Gat, was an American businessman, farmer, sportsman and politician regarded as "the father of football in the United States" as the founder of Oneida Football Club, considered the first organized team to play any form of football in the country. The Oneida Club established informal rules which came to be known as the "Boston game" and are considered the first step to the codification of rules for association football, rugby football, or American football.

Miller was the namesake of his grandfather, the famous abolitionist, businessman, and philanthropist Gerrit Smith. His parents were Smith's daughter, Elizabeth Smith Miller, and her husband Charles Dudley Miller. He grew up on the family's estate in Peterboro, New York, helping his grandfather by hiding escaped slaves in a barn or attic. Starting in October 1860 he attended the school of Epes Sargent Dixwell in Boston, and in 1867 married Dixwell's daughter Susan Hunt Dixwell. (Justice Oliver Wendell Holmes Jr., married a sister.) He enrolled in Harvard in 1865, but set back by health problems, left before graduating; in 1924 the university awarded him an honorary Master of Arts degree.

== Overview ==
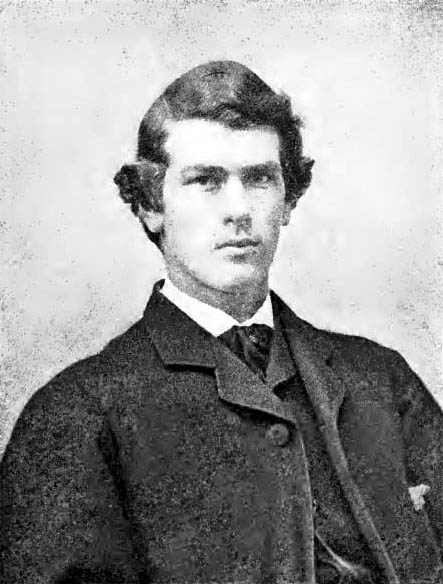
Miller c. 1863, during his leadership of the Oneida Football Club.

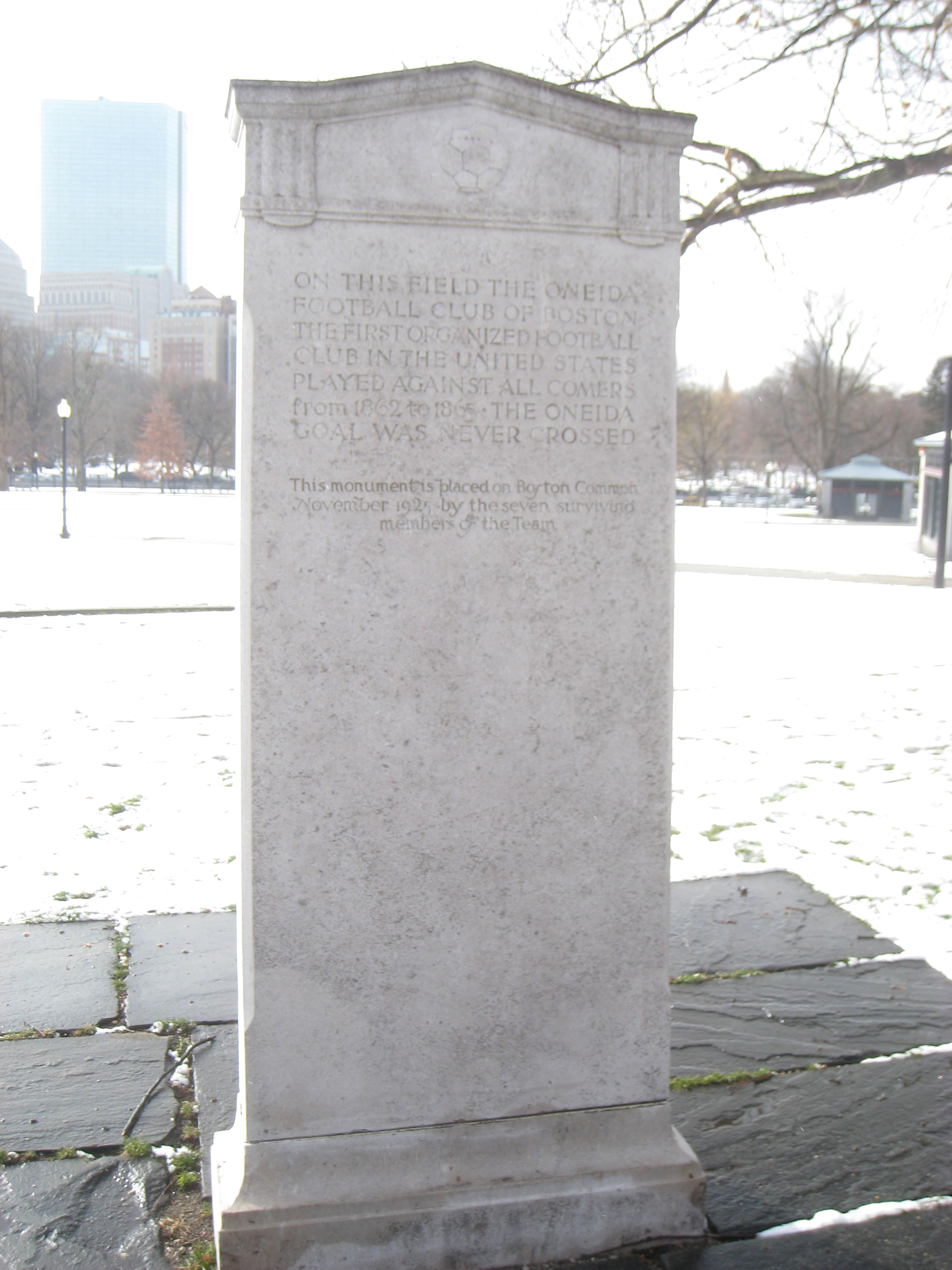
"On this field the Oneida Football Club of Boston, the first organized football club in the United States played against all comers from 1862 to 1865 — The Oneida goal was never crossed. This monument is placed on Boston Common November 1925 by the seven surviving members of the Team"

Miller was primarily an importer and breeder of Holstein-Friesian cattle. His was the first herd of Holsteins in the country, according to a 1929 souvenir program of a Holstein field day and picnic, held at his farm. In Madison County, New York, where Peterboro is located, there were in 1931 more Holstein cattle than in any other county in the country, and more than in most states. More than half of the milk consumed in the United States came from this breed.

He was the founder of the Oneida Football Club of Boston, in 1862, which is regarded as the first organised team to play any form of football in the United States. (Because of this, there was in the late 1940s talk of hosting a national football hall of fame in Cazenovia.) He subsequently played on Harvard's baseball team, and was known later in Cazenovia and Peterboro as "the best base ball player in this part of the country,” according to the page on him in the baseball history section of the National Baseball Hall of Fame.

He was a member of the New York State Assembly in 1880.

He was the donor of land and otherwise supported the George Junior Republic at Freeville, New York, of which he was a trustee from 1897 to 1907.

Miller's health failed after the burning on March 2, 1936, of his home, built by his great-grandfather, Peter Smith, in 1803. He died a year later. Fortunately, Miller had already, in 1928, given to the Syracuse University Libraries his grandfather's huge collection of correspondence, business records, daybooks, and pamphlets. Some of his own papers were destroyed in the fire.

He and his wife had three sons, of whom two reached adulthood: Gerrit Smith Miller Jr., a renowned zoologist, and Basil Dixwell Miller.
