= Smithfield, New York =

- Town
- Location within New York Location within the United States
- Coordinates: 42°57′58″N 75°40′0″W
- Country: United States
- State: New York
- County: Madison
- Established: 1807

Government
  - Type: Town Council
  - Town Supervisor: Thomas J. Stokes (R)
  - Town Council: Members' List: • James A. Zophy, III (R); • Richard J. Looft (R); • David G. Brooks (R); • Brenda Goff (D)

Area
  - Total: 24.53 sq mi (63.52 km^{2})
  - Land: 24.44 sq mi (63.30 km^{2})
  - Water: 0.085 sq mi (0.22 km^{2})
- Elevation: 1,322 ft (403 m)

Population (2020)
  - Total: 1,127
  - Density: 46.1/sq mi (17.8/km^{2})
- Time zone: UTC-5 (Eastern (EST))
  - Summer (DST): UTC-4 (EDT)
- ZIP Codes: 13134 (Peterboro); 13032 (Canastota); 13035 (Cazenovia); 13408 (Morrisville); 13409 (Munnsville); 13421 (Oneida)
- Area code: 315
- FIPS code: 36-053-67785
- GNIS feature ID: 0979497
- Website: townofsmithfield.org/content

Smithfield is a town in Madison County, New York, United States. Administrative offices are in the hamlet of Peterboro. The town is named after Peter Smith, an original land owner. As of the 2020 census, the population was 1,127, down from 1,288 in 2010.

== History ==
The region was first settled around 1797. The town was organized in 1807 from land taken from the town of Cazenovia.

=== 2014 tornado ===
At 7:02 p.m. on July 8, 2014, Smithfield was struck by an EF2 tornado with peak estimated winds of 135 mph (217 km/h). The tornado killed four people and destroyed several homes. One house was carried 150 yards (140 m) and thrown into another home. A three-story house was rolled off its foundation down a hill, and the occupant inside was killed.

== Geography ==
Smithfield is in central Madison County, 5 miles (8 km) north of Morrisville, 9 miles (14 km) northeast of Cazenovia, and 11 miles (18 km) south of Oneida.

According to the U.S. Census Bureau, the town has a total area of 24.5 square miles (63 km^{2}), of which 24.4 square miles (63 km^{2}) are land and 0.1 square miles (0.3 km^{2}), or 0.35% are water. Oneida Creek rises in the center of the town and flows east and north toward Oneida Lake. Cowaselon Creek, a separate tributary of Oneida Lake, drains the northeastern part of the town. Morrisville Swamp, on the southern border of the town, drains south into the headwaters of the Chenango River, part of the Susquehanna River watershed.

== Demographics ==
Historical population
Census	Pop.	Note	%±
1820	3,338		—
1830	2,636		−21.0%
1840	1,699		−35.5%
1850	1,669		−1.8%
1860	1,509		−9.6%
1870	1,227		−18.7%
1880	1,226		−0.1%
1890	1,043		−14.9%
1900	989		−5.2%
1910	880		−11.0%
1920	767		−12.8%
1930	653		−14.9%
1940	630		−3.5%
1950	758		20.3%
1960	804		6.1%
1970	864		7.5%
1980	1,001		15.9%
1990	1,053		5.2%
2000	1,205		14.4%
2010	1,288		6.9%
2020	1,127		−12.5%
U.S. Decennial Census

As of the census of 2000, there were 1,205 people, 415 households, and 315 families residing in the town. The population density was 49.5 inhabitants per square mile (19.1/km^{2}). There were 446 housing units at an average density of 18.3 per square mile (7.1/km^{2}). The racial makeup of the town was 96.68% White, 1.00% African American, 0.83% Native American, 0.25% Asian, and 1.24% from two or more races. Hispanic or Latino of any race were 0.25% of the population.

There were 415 households, out of which 42.4% had children under the age of 18 living with them, 59.8% were married couples living together, 8.9% had a female householder with no husband present, and 23.9% were non-families. 16.9% of all households were made up of individuals, and 5.5% had someone living alone who was 65 years of age or older. The average household size was 2.90 and the average family size was 3.25.

In the town, the population was spread out, with 31.2% under the age of 18, 7.5% from 18 to 24, 30.5% from 25 to 44, 22.9% from 45 to 64, and 7.9% who were 65 years of age or older. The median age was 35 years. For every 100 females, there were 103.2 males. For every 100 females age 18 and over, there were 102.2 males.

The median income for a household in the town was $35,109, and the median income for a family was $38,333. Males had a median income of $28,618 versus $23,125 for females. The per capita income for the town was $14,860. About 12.6% of families and 16.2% of the population were below the poverty line, including 22.2% of those under age 18 and 16.8% of those age 65 or over.

== Communities and locations ==
- Bliss Corners – A location south of Peterboro.
- Eisaman Corners – A location in the northern part of the town.
- Embury Corners – A location in the southeastern corner of the town.
- Peterboro – A hamlet in the center of the town, where the Gerrit Smith Estate and Peter Smith Land Office are located.
- Siloam – A hamlet northeast of Peterboro.
