= Peterboro, New York =

- Hamlet
- 1875 map

- Location within New York Location within the United States
- Coordinates: 42°58′00″N 75°41′10″W
- Country: United States
- State: New York
- County: Madison
- Town: Smithfield
- Elevation: 1,296 ft (395 m)
- Time zone: UTC-5 (Eastern (EST))
  - Summer (DST): UTC-4 (EDT)
- ZIP code: 13134
- Area codes: 315 & 680
- GNIS feature ID: 960231

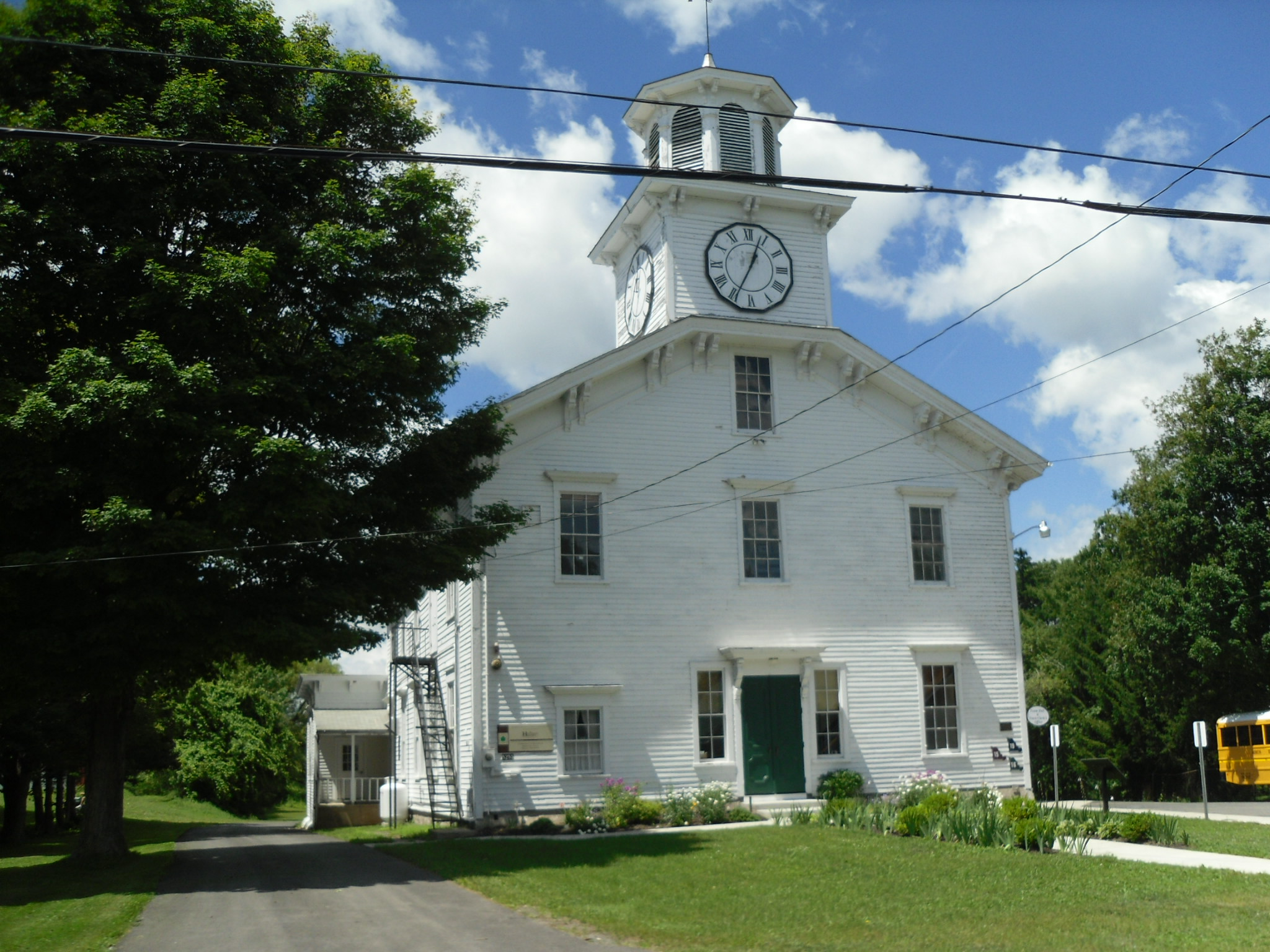
Smithfield Town Hall and town clerk's office (small sign at right), Peterboro, New York. On upper floor, the National Abolition Hall of Fame and Museum. Built in 1820 as Presbyterian church.

Peterboro, located approximately 25 miles (40 km) southeast of Syracuse, New York, is a historic hamlet and currently the administrative center for the Town of Smithfield, Madison County, New York, United States.

== History ==
=== Founding ===
In 1795, Peter Smith Sr., a partner of John Jacob Astor's who built his fortune in the fur trade, founded Peterborough, naming the town after himself. Smith moved his family to Peterborough in 1804 and built the family home there, in what at the time was near-wilderness. His son Gerrit changed the spelling of the name to Peterboro.

=== Abolitionism ===
Because of its most famous resident—businessman, philanthropist, and public intellectual Gerrit Smith—Peterboro was before the U.S. Civil War the capital of the U.S. abolition movement. Peterboro was, according to Rev. Henry Highland Garnet, the only place in the country where fugitive slave catchers did not dare show their faces, the only place the New York Anti-Slavery Society could meet (a mob chased it out of Utica), the only place where fugitive slaves ever met as a group—the Fugitive Slave Convention of 1850, held in neighboring Cazenovia because Peterboro was too small for the expected crowd. Abolitionist leaders such as John Brown, Frederick Douglass, Harriet Tubman, and many others were constant guests in Smith's house. So many fugitive slaves headed for Peterboro, and Smith, that there is a book about them, and some never left Peterboro, forming a Black community from an early date.

A visiting minister wrote in 1841:

At Peterboro (the residence of Gerrit Smith), I found as may well be expected, it was all Abolition—Abolition in doors and out—Abolition in the churches and Abolition in the stores—Abolition in the field and Abolition by the wayside. If I should use a figure, I would say that Peterboro is Bible-baptized into Abolition, in the name of the Father, and of the Son, and of the Holy Ghost.

According to abolitionist Julia Griffiths:

I always breathe more freely in Peterboro, than elsewhere. The moral atmosphere is so clear here...

This was not true elsewhere in Madison County.

The Presbyterian church, not needed by the Presbyterians after 1870, was bought by Gerrit Smith for use as an academy and public hall. It held a small public school for many years. Currently, besides the Town of Smithfield office, it houses the National Abolition Hall of Fame and Museum. Gerrit Smith's mansion was lost to fire in 1936, but his office, the Peterboro Land Office, has survived.

== Notable people ==
=== Smith family ===
In the 1820s, Gerrit Smith took over the business interests of his father, Peter Smith Sr., managing his family's property holdings in the town and the surrounding area. The Peterboro Land Office—the most important surviving building of the Smith estate—was built as his office for these activities. Gerrit Smith's commitment to both the abolition and temperance movements led to the Smith estate in Peterboro becoming a stop on the underground railroad. Less successful was Smith's temperance campaign, which did not enjoy local support; he built one of the first temperance hotels in the country in Peterboro, but it was not commercially successful. He was reported to be liked by almost all the people of Peterboro. "He does a vast deal of good here." After John Brown's raid, when Smith expected to be indicted, the people of Peterboro were prepared to use force (guns) to prevent his arrest.

Smith was married to abolitionist Ann Carroll Fitzhugh. Notable family members include their daughter, philanthropist Elizabeth Smith Miller, their son, ornithologist Greene Smith, their grandson Gerrit Smith Miller, known as "the father of football in the United States", and their great-grandson Gerrit Smith Miller, Jr., a naturalist.

Elizabeth Cady Stanton, a founder of the women's rights movement and first cousin of Gerrit Smith on his mother's side, met her husband, Henry B. Stanton, at the Smith home in 1839, where she spent many months. He had come from Utica to Peterboro to speak. Attending abolition meetings in Madison County, she wrote, "I shall never forget those charming drives over the hills in Madison County, the bright autumnal days, and the bewitching moonlight nights. The enthusiasm of the people in these great meetings, the thrilling oratory and lucid argument of the speakers, all conspired to make these days memorable as among the most charming in my life."

=== Others ===
- Jeanette L. Douglass, born in Peterboro and later moved to Ilion, was the first woman employed by the federal government.
- Alexander Preston Ellinwood, Wisconsin politician, teacher, and businessman, was born in Peterboro.
- Rev. Henry Highland Garnet, a Black minister and abolitionist, who was quoted as saying: "There are yet two places where slaveholders cannot come—Heaven and Peterboro."
- James Caleb Jackson, nutritionist, abolitionist
- George Pack, his wife Maria Lathrop, and family resided in Peterboro in the late 1830s and early 1840s. From Peterboro, Pack went on to Michigan's Lower Peninsula, where he founded the family's business interests in timber. Pack's son, George Willis Pack, who was born in Peterboro, and grandson, Charles Lathrop Pack, both became well-known timbermen in their own right.

== Historic sites ==
- In 2001, the Gerrit Smith Estate was designated a National Historic Landmark.
- The Peterboro Land Office building and Smithfield Presbyterian Church, now housing the Smithfield Town Hall and Abolition Hall of Fame, are listed on the National Register of Historic Places.
- The Church of Peterboro, at Park Street and Swamp Road, founded in 1843 by Gerrit Smith, in the 20th century became a private dwelling. Among those that spoke there were Frederick Douglass, William Lloyd Garrison, Sojourner Truth, and Harriet Tubman.

== See also ==
- Fugitive Slave Convention (Cazenovia, New York)
- National Abolition Hall of Fame and Museum
- Peterboro Area Museum
- Peterborough (disambiguation)
