= Fugitive Slave Convention =

Convention held to oppose the Fugitive Slave Act of 1850

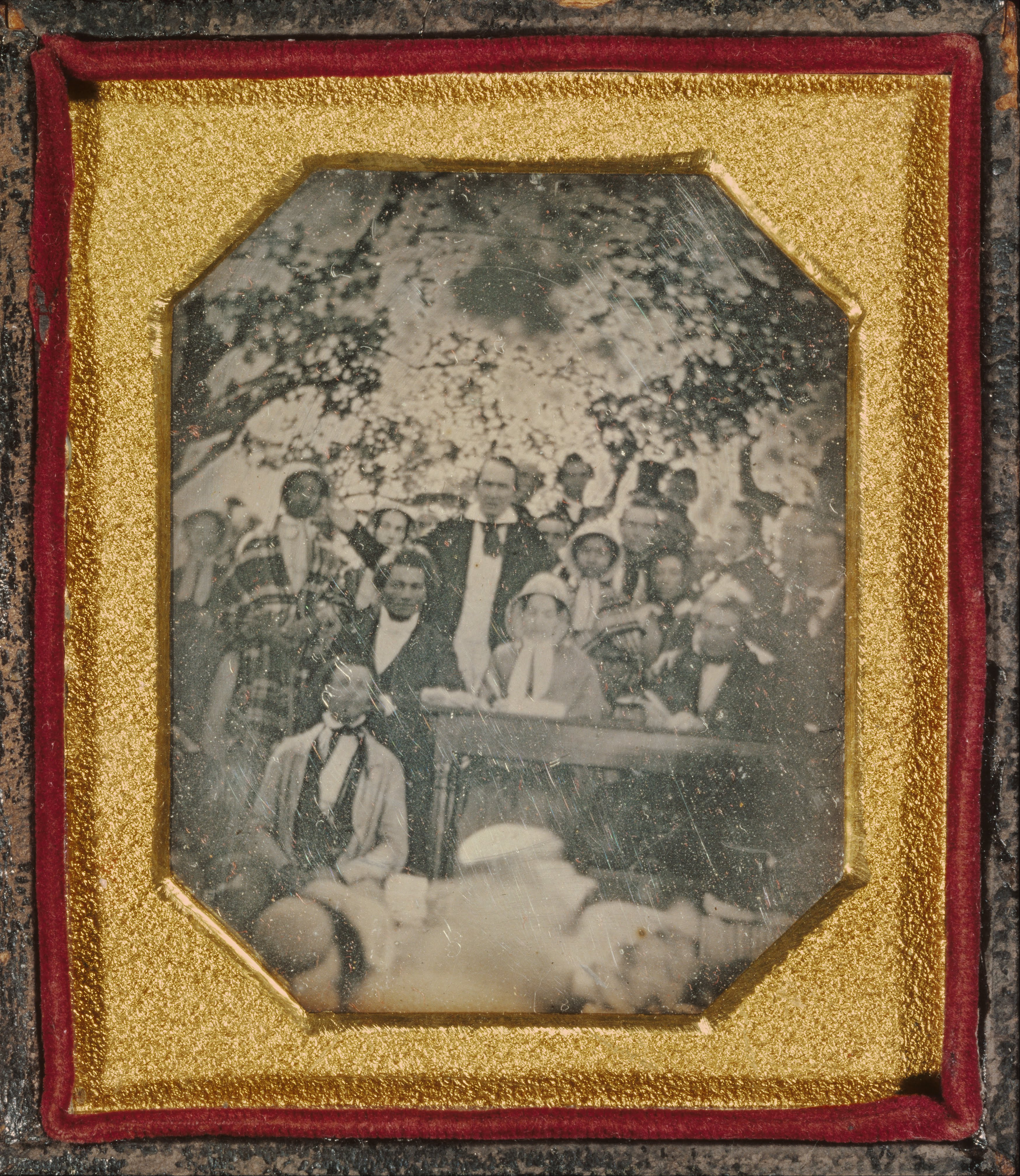
Now-famous daguerreotype of the convention, by local photographer and abolitionist Ezra Greenleaf Weld. Frederick Douglass is seated with his elbow on the table; Gerrit Smith is standing, his arm outstretched.

The Fugitive Slave Convention was held in Cazenovia, New York, on August 21 and 22, 1850. It was a fugitive slave meeting, the biggest ever held in the United States. Madison County, New York, was the abolition headquarters of the country, because of philanthropist and activist Gerrit Smith, who lived in neighboring Peterboro, New York, and called the meeting "in behalf of the New York State Vigilance Committee." Hostile newspaper reports refer to the meeting as "Gerrit Smith's Convention". Nearly fifty fugitives attended—the largest gathering of fugitive slaves in the nation's history.

This was one month before the Fugitive Slave Act of 1850 was passed by the United States Congress; its passage was a foregone conclusion, and the convention never even discussed how its passage could be prevented. Instead the question was what the existing fugitive slaves were to do, and how their friends could help them. Many resolutions and position statements were passed; this was the first time slaves still in bondage were publicly encouraged to abscond, stealing their master's fastest horse and money, and using violence if necessary. Participants included Frederick Douglass, until recently himself a fugitive slave, the Edmonson sisters, Gerrit Smith, Samuel Joseph May, Theodore Dwight Weld, his wife Angelina Grimké, and others.

The original plan had been for William L. Chaplin, the General Agent of the New York State Antislavery Society, to make a dramatic appearance with some fugitive slaves that he was to spirit out off the South. It was not to be; things went awry.

The meeting was chaired by Douglass. The local links with the abolitionist movement were Theodore Weld's brother Ezra Greenleaf Weld, who owned a daguerreotype (photography) studio in Cazenovia and to whom we owe a picture of the principal attendees, taken to show Chaplin his supporters meeting. Even more important, the abolitionist philanthropist Gerrit Smith, one of the Secret Six that years later would finance John Brown's raid on Harpers Ferry, lived only 10 miles (16 km) away, in more rural Peterboro. The first book on Madison County, of 1899, says much of Smith, but mentions neither the Convention nor Ezra Weld.

The meeting was forgotten until a daguerreotype was discovered in the archives of the Madison County Historical Society in 1994. Judge Hugh C. Humphreys, who found the daguerreotype, identified the meeting through period newspapers.

== Madison County, New York, a haven for slaves ==
New York was the safest state for fugitive slaves, according to Gerrit Smith, the richest man in New York State and organizer of the convention. He made of Madison County in particular a place where slave catchers did not dare show their faces. "The vicinity of Cazenovia and Syracuse was such a locality where the enforcement of the fugitive slave enactments was vigorously and violently opposed." He helped every fugitive that reached his home in neighboring Peterboro—feeding them, sheltering them, and helping them get to Syracuse, also safe, and from there across nearby Lake Ontario to Canada.

A visitor in 1841 described Peterboro thus:

At Peterboro, I found as may well be expected, it was all Abolition—Abolition in doors and out—Abolition in the churches and Abolition in the stores—Abolition in the field and Abolition by the wayside. If I should use a figure, I would say that Peterboro is Bible-baptized into Abolition, in the name of the Father, and of the Son, and of the Holy Ghost.

Between 1840 and 1843 three different abolitionist weeklies were published in Cazenovia: the Cazenovia Abolitionist, Onondaga and Madison Abolitionist, and Madison County Abolitionist.

There was a colored conventions movement, but these were free blacks that were meeting. The Convention in Cazenovia—Peterboro was a "tiny hamlet", too small for the number of visitors expected—is the only "Convention of Slaves" ever held in the United States, as it was called by Douglass in The North Star. Douglass, a Black man, presided.

Peterboro is since about 2005 the site of the National Abolition Hall of Fame and Museum.

== Call for the convention ==
The following announcement appeared in the August 1, 1850, issue of the National Anti-Slavery Standard:

LIBERTY—EQUALITY—FRATERNITY!!!

Fugitives from the prison-house of Southern despotism with their friends and protectors in council!
Such persons as have escaped from Slavery, and those who are resolved to stand by them, are invited to meet for mutual counsel and encouragement at Cazenovia, Madison County, New York, on Wednesday, 21st of August, 1850. The assembling will take place at 10 o'clock A. M. in the Independent Church, and the meeting will continue through two days. The object aimed at on the occasion will not be simply an exchange of congratulations and an expression of sympathy, but an earnest consideration of such subjects as are pertinent to the present condition and prospects of the slave and free colored population of the country, and to the relations, which good and true men sustain to the cause of impartial freedom and justice. Friends! shall not this be made a grand event? Shall not the channels of former sympathies be opened anew? Will not they of the "old guard" delight to look each other in the face once more, and renew their vows upon a common altar? Let them come from every quarter—freemen, free women, and fugitives! They are bid a most cordial welcome by the good people of Cazenovia. There are friends, hospitalities, meeting houses, and beautiful groves there! Let all come, who have a heart and can!

In befalf of the New York State Vigilance Committee,
Gerrit Smith, President
Charles B. Ray, Secretary

It was promptly reprinted in Frederick Douglass's North Star, William Garrison's Liberator, and other anti-slavery papers. It was also reprinted, with outrage, in a number of Southern and pro-slavery Northern newspapers.

== Venues ==
The convention opened at what the announcement called "the Independent Church", later the Free Congregational Church of Cazenovia and then (2022) Cazenovia College's theater building. The capacity was 400, and there were hundreds who could not get in. There was an unsuccessful attempt to move the meeting to the Methodist church, and a resolution by Gerrit Smith to move the meeting to nearby Peterboro was defeated. As no other church would host the meeting, it moved the next day to "the orchard of Grace Wilson's School, located on Sullivan Street." Although there were in 1850s no railroads in Cazenovia, it was said to have had 2,000 to 3,000 participants. In the 1850 census the population of Cazenovia was 4,800.

== Convention activities ==
Two newspapers, the Madison Daily Whig and the Utica Daily Gazette (also Whig) sent reporters, who with the Cazenovia weekly provided detailed, session-by-session accounts. The Gazette's reports were reprinted nationally, although the New York Tribune got much of the credit. The official minutes were quite abbreviated and the newspaper reports add significant details.

=== William Chaplin ===
A feature of the convention, as originally planned, was that William Chaplin was to make "a dramatic appearance", together with some enslaved who he had helped escape.

Chaplin was a radical political abolitionist who helped plan the escape of 77 slaves from Washington, D.C. This plan ultimately failed and Chaplin was later arrested after he was caught driving a carriage with two escaped slaves. His fiancée, Theodosia Gilbert, attended the convention. There was a resolution by James C. Jackson that was adopted to create a committee to raise money in order to liberate Chaplin. He advised them to raise $20,000 in 30 days. They also called upon the Liberty Party to nominate Chaplin as its candidate in the 1852 presidential election.

== First day activities ==
=== Morning session ===
The meeting was called to order at 10 a.m. "at the Free Church" by James C. Jackson. Samuel Joseph May was chosen President pro tem and temporary secretary Samuel Thomas Jr. May then appointed Samuel Wells, J.W. Loguen, and Charles B. Ray to a committee to nominate official officers. Later in the convention, official officers were appointed by this committee to major positions. Frederick Douglass was appointed to president. Joseph C. Hathaway, Rev. Francis Hawley (a woman, pastor of the Free Church), Charles B. Ray, and Charles A. Wheaton were appointed for vice presidents. Charles D. Miller and Anne V. Adams were appointed for secretaries.

Joseph C. Hathaway, William R. Smith, Eleazer Seymour, and James C. Jackson were appointed to nominate people for the "Chaplin Committee", "whose business it shall be to adaopt such measures, as they shall judge fit to effect his liberation," which might well "require the expenditure of large sums of money."

This committee ended up consisting of around 19 people. Some of the committee members included James C. Jackson, Joseph C. Hathaway, William R. Smith, and George W. Lawson.

A group of women including Mrs. F. Rice, Phebe Hathaway, and Louisa Burnett were appointed to nominate a committee of females. This committee would obtain a silver pitcher and two silver goblets to present them to William C. Chaplin, in honor of "his distinguished services in the cause of humanity."

=== Afternoon session ===
The meeting was called to order by C. B. Ray, prayer by Rev. Mr. Snow. During the first part of the afternoon session, the Chaplin affair was addressed, with a lengthy oral report by Joseph Hathaway, who had visited Chaplin in jail. On the conclusion, the Address Committee reported on two proposals: one "to the slaves of the South from the fugitives of the North," and one to "the Abolition party" (the Liberty Party), recommending Chaplin be chosen as their candidate for governor. The convention got down to the main item of business, the letter to the slaves. The Committee on Resolutions presented a report, and a committee of 23 was appointed to raise money to aid in Chaplin's defense.

Since no larger church would allow the meeting, Gerrit Smith moved that they meet the next day in his home town, Peterboro, 10 miles away, which motion failed. A grove was obtained for use the next day.

It was 10 pm when the convention adjourned. The main item of business, the Letter to the Slaves, had been adopted after hard and protacted debate. Much of it was telegraphed to the New York papers that night.

=== Evening session ===
Prayer by the Rev. Mr. Snow, after which the evening was spent on the address and resolutions.

== Second day activities (August 22) ==
According to the Madison County Whig, on the 2nd day, at the point of greatest attendance there were 700 present.

A circular from the Chaplin Fund Committee was issued, dated the 22nd.

On the last afternoon, the question of free produce was examined. Mr. Smith declared himself an abstainer from slave produce.

== Resolutions and letters passed ==
=== "A Letter to the American Slaves from those who have fled from American Slavery" ===
What distinguished this convention from other anti-slavery meetings was the open letter titled "To American Slaves from those who have fled from American Slavery", written, "it is said", by Gerrit Smith, who introduced it to the attendees; Smith's authorship was confirmed by Garrison in The Liberator. This letter encouraged those still enslaved to run away, saying it was their duty to do so, and exposing the lies of their owners about life in the North. It recommended those escaping enslavement steal their owners' fastest horses and their cash. It quotes the state motto of Virginia—"Death to Tyrants"—and says it should be the Black man's motto as well. "You are prisoners of war...and therefore, by all the rules of war, you have the fullest liberty to plunder, burn, and kill, as you may have occasion to do to promote your escape."

It was reprinted in part in many papers, especially the passage endorsing violence, and in full in the abolition newspapers. This—not the meeting itself—was national news.

=== Letter to the Liberty Party ===
Text of the Letter to the Liberty Party, from The North Star, September 5, 1850, p. 3.

The body recommended to the Liberty Party that at its upcoming convention in Oswego, they nominate Chaplin for president.

=== Resolutions ===
Text of the Resolutions, from The North Star, September 5, 1850, p. 3.

=== Impact of the statements ===
The statements published "exceed in atrocity the most sanguinary edicts of the most sanguinary club which sat during the French revolution." They are "a sad portent in the history of public affairs," which "augurs alarming consequences to the Union." According to the New York Herald, the "free nigger convention" was "one of the most bare-faced, impudent, and presumpt[u]ous exhibitions of fanaticism and treason, which was ever perpetrated in any country."

== Attendees and their roles ==
Compared with previous abolitionist meetings, the people at Cazenovia were extraordinarily diverse. Not only were there both Black and white participants, there were many women, who were welcomed. A correspondent wrote, "A large number of persons of every sect in religion, of every party in politics, and every shade of complexion, met in this magnificent temple of nature" [the grove].

Based on the convention proceedings, published in Frederick Douglass's North Star and the National Anti-Slavery Standard, most easily consulted in Proceedings of the Black State Conventions 1840–1865, the Madison County Whig, and the New-York Tribune, from where they were reprinted elsewhere, attending the convention were:

- Black attendees
  - James Baker was on the business committee of the convention. He was also named to the Committee on Address and Resolution from the fugitive slaves, chaired by Jermain Loguen. He was probably one of the fugitive slaves.
  - George W. Clark, abolitionist composer. Author and compiler of The Free Soil Minstrel, 1848, and The Harp of Freedom, 1856. He and the Edmondson sisters "favored the meeting with occasional songs." Clark sent a letter to the New York Tribune with corrections to their coverage.
  - Frederick Douglass, formerly an escaped slave, memoirist, elected president of the convention.⟨⟩
  - The Edmonson sisters, Mary and Emily, 15 and 17, formerly escaped slaves aboard The Pearl, William Chaplin's failed project. They sang "I hear the voice of Lovejoy on Alton's bloody plain" at the opening.
  - A Mr. Johnson of Ithaca, "so black that when he closed his eyes and mouth, his face was invisible."
  - Rev. Jermain W. Loguen, arguably the most famous escaped slave in the U.S., who refused to purchase his freedom or let others purchase it for him, bishop of the African Methodist Episcopal Church, ran Underground Railroad depot in Syracuse. Named to Committee to nominate convention officers; chairman of committee on addresses.
  - E. L. Platt, probably one of the fugitive slaves, member with James Baker of the committee to report on their resolutions.
  - Charles Bennett Ray, born free, publisher of The Colored American (New York City). With Gerrit Smith, signed call for convention. Secretary of the New York State Vigilance Committee. Elected Vice President of the meeting.
  - According to the Proceedings, some thirty fugitive slaves were present, who were requested to sit together, so they could be seen by the delegates. Another report gives their number as fifty. On the second day, some presented narratives of their escapes.
  - Invited but did not attend
    - Samuel Ringgold Ward (1817 – c. 1864), escaped slavery with his parents when a small child. A preacher and activist. Nominated for vice president of the convention. Sent letter regretting his inability to attend.
- White attendees
  - Anna P. Adams. Secretary of the convention (with Charles D. Miller).
  - Caroline Brown. Appointed to Business Committee.
  - Miss Burwell. Named to ladies' committee to raise funds for Chaplin gift.
  - S. P. Chase. Member of Chaplin Fund Committee.
  - C. D. Cleveland, Philadelphia. Member of Chaplin Fund Committee.
  - James H. Collins, Chicago. Member of Chaplin Fund Committee.
  - Silas Cornell, 1789–1864, mapmaker. Member of Chaplin Fund Committee.
  - Edward M. Davis (1811–1887), Pennsylvania abolitionist. Married Lucretia Mott's daughter; served in the Union Army. Member of Chaplin Fund Committee.
  - Thomas Davis (1806–1895), jewelry manufacturer, member of Congress from Rhode Island. Member of Chaplin Fund Committee.
  - Charles Durkee, U.S. Representative from Wisconsin, one of founders of Republican Party. Member of Chaplin Fund Committee.
  - Samuel Fessenden, Portland, Maine. Member of Chaplin Fund Committee.
  - Charles C. Foote, Michigan, Vice-Presidential nominee of the Liberty Party in 1852. Member of Chaplin Fund Committee.
  - Joshua Reed Giddings, Ashtabula, Ohio, attorney, one of founders of Republican Party. Member of Chaplin Fund Committee.
  - Theodosia Gilbert, fiancée of William L. Chaplin.
  - William Goodell (1792–1878), minister and lecturer, co-founder of the American Anti-Slavery Society and editor of its first official organ, The Emancipator.
  - Angelina Grimké, Weld's wife; leading abolitionist woman. The presence of her sister Sarah, who lived with the couple, is possible but undocumented.
  - Cyrus Pitt Grosvenor, Baptist minister, president, New York Central College. Member of Chaplin Fund Committee. He was accompanied by Edward Mathews, also from McGrawville, New York; both addressed the convention, probably during the second day.
  - William Harned, New York City. Member of Chaplin Fund Committee.
  - Beebe Hathaway. Named to ladies' committee to raise funds for Chaplin gift.
  - Joseph C. Hathaway (1810–1873), an influential Quaker farmer and abolitionist, of Waterloo, New York. Elected Vice President of the meeting. Named to committee to draft resolutions about Chaplin.
  - Rev. Francis Hawley, pastor of the Free Congregational Church, the meeting's first venue. Described locally as "one of many who has fallen into Gerrit Smithism". Chosen as vice president of the convention.
  - Mrs. Howett made on the first afternoon a speech against the anti-abolitionists of New York City.
  - Francis Jackson (1789–1861), Boston businessman and politician, helped fugitive slaves. President of the Massachusetts Anti-Slavery Society. Member of Chaplin Fund Committee.
  - James Caleb Jackson (1811–1895), from nearby Manlius, nutritionist, ran "water cure" establishment at Glen Haven, New York. A friend of Chaplin and colleague of his at the Albany Patriot. Called the convention to order when it started. Had been editor of the Madison County Whig, published in Cazenovia. Named to committee to draft resolutions about Chaplin. Chairman of the Chaplin Fund Committee.
  - George W. Johnson, Buffalo. Member of Chaplin Fund Committee.
  - George W. Julian (1817–1899), antislavery Whig from Indiana, became Radical Republican. Member of Congress 1849–1852 and 1861–1871. Member of Chaplin Fund Committee.
  - George Lawson, Oriskany, New York. Member of Chaplin Fund Committee.
  - Julius F. LeMoyne, Washington, Pennsylvania. Member of Chaplin Fund Committee.
  - Edward Mathews. See Cyrus Pitt Grosvenor, above. He submitted a lengthy report to the weekly American Baptist newspaper.
  - Samuel Joseph May (1797–1871), abolitionist clergyman from Syracuse, co-secretary of the Chaplin Fund Committee. Chosen President pro tem. Secretary of the Chaplin Fund Committee.
  - Charles D. Miller. Secretary of the convention (with Anna Adams). Gerrit Smith's son-in-law.
  - E. S. Platt, member of Committee on Address and Resolution, chaired by Jermain Loguen.
  - Charles B. Ray. Cosigned Smith's call for the convention. Named to Committee to nominate convention officers.
  - C. F. Rice. Appointed to Business Committee.
  - Mrs. F. Rice. Named to ladies' committee to raise funds for Chaplin gift.
  - Rowland Robinson, 17, future author and illustrator. Member of Chaplin Fund Committee.
  - Elmore Seymour. Named to committee to draft resolutions about Chaplin.
  - E. Smith. Named to committee to draft resolutions about Chaplin.
  - Gerrit Smith, land investor, philanthropist. Appointed to Business Committee. Treasurer of the Chaplin Fund Committee.
  - William R. Smith, Macedon, New York. Named to committee to draft resolutions about Chaplin. Member of Chaplin Fund Committee.
  - Mary Springstead. Appointed to Business Committee.
  - Ednah D. Thomas, Aurora, Cayuga County, New York. Member of Chaplin Fund Committee.
  - John Todd, Pittsfield, Massachusetts, minister and author. Member of Chaplin Fund Committee.
  - Ezra Greenleaf Weld, ran a successful daguerreotype studio in Cazenovia for many years. Theodore Weld's brother. A little-known and unsigned report by a man who "went to the Fugitive Slave Convention, the other day, for the purpose of daguerrotyping" was presumably by him.
  - Theodore Dwight Weld, abolitionist organizer. Brother of Ezra.
  - Samuel Wells. Named to Committee to nominate convention officers.
  - Charles Augustus Wheaton (1809–1882), merchant, member New York State Vigilance Committee. A well-known abolitionist with a long association with Gerrit Smith. Elected Vice President of the meeting. Secretary of the Chaplin Fund Committee.
  - John Greenleaf Whittier (1807–1892), abolitionist poet, editor at that time of The National Era, an anti-slavery newspaper. Member of Chaplin Fund Committee.
- Refused to attend
  - Beriah Green.

Various estimates of attendance were made. The Madison County Whig reported 250, of whom a third were Blacks, and "a large portion of the remainder" were women. 500 delegates passed through Utica en route to the Cazenovia convention. Reports give total attendance as 2,000.

A newspaper story mistakenly reported that John Brown was present and "made a very fiery speech" (in 1850) about his need of funds to buy arms for his and his sons' use fighting slavery in Kansas (1855–56). This speech of Brown was at a different, later meeting (in Syracuse).

== Reaction ==
Many negative reports on the convention were published by pro-slavery newspapers.

The convention was mentioned in the U.S. Senate the next day, August 23, during debate on the 1850 Fugitive Slave Bill:

During the debate upon the bill, Mr. Yulee [Senator Yulee, of Florida] read from the New York Journal of Commerce a report of an amalgamated ["racially" mixed] Convention at Cazenovia, commenting on its incendiary address, and calling the attention of the people of the [S]outh to it as a sample of the opinions and feelings of the North in relation to the rights of the South...

Senator Daniel Dickinson, of New York, responded that Mr. Yulee "would never have alluded to it if he knew the scorn and contempt with which all such proceedings were looked upon by the great mass of people of all parties, in the North."

== Subsequent meetings ==
Further meetings were announced in Canastota (October 23), Cazenovia (October 25), Hamilton (October 30), and Peterboro (November 1).

Many of the participants of this convention were also involved in a later anti-fugitive slave law meeting in Syracuse, New York, on Tuesday, January 7, 1851, presided over by Frederick Douglass; 17 resolutions and an address were adopted.

== The daguerreotype ==
There is one and only one visual image of the meeting, in the daguerreotype held by the Madison County Historical Society, with a smaller copy (image flipped) in the J. Paul Getty Museum in Los Angeles. It was taken by Ezra Greenleaf Weld, Theodore's brother, who owned a daguerreotype studio in Cazenovia.

Daguerreotypes could not be taken casually, as those being photographed had to hold themselves immobile for some seconds. That of the Cazenovia Convention is a formal group picture, outdoors because of the sunlight. It was intended for the eyes of William L. Chaplin, in jail in Washington for having assisted two slaves in an unsuccessful escape attempt. Chaplin's future wife, Theodosia Gilbert Chaplin, is seated at the table with pen and paper in hand, documenting through the picture that "the document" was indeed prepared by the group. To her left is Frederick Douglass; to her right, also with pen, is Joseph Hathaway; behind her stands Gerrit Smith, flanked by the Edmonson sisters. One of the sisters, probably Mary, addressed the crowd. One audience member described her as a "young and noble-hearted girl", using "words of simple and touching eloquence".

== Reenactment ==
On February 24, 2023, students at Broome Community College (SUNY Broome) presented "an original reenactment of the events at The Cazenovia Convention." This presentation, featuring students playing Frederick Douglass, Gerrit Smith, and the Edmonson sisters, and featuring songs such as "I hear the voice of Lovejoy from Alton's bloody plain", was repeated at the 2023 Juneteenth celebration at the National Abolition Hall of Fame and Museum, in Peterboro, New York.

== See also ==
- Colored Conventions Movement
- Fugitive slaves in the United States
- Nashville Convention
