= William L. Chaplin =

American abolitionist (1796–1871)

William Lawrence Chaplin
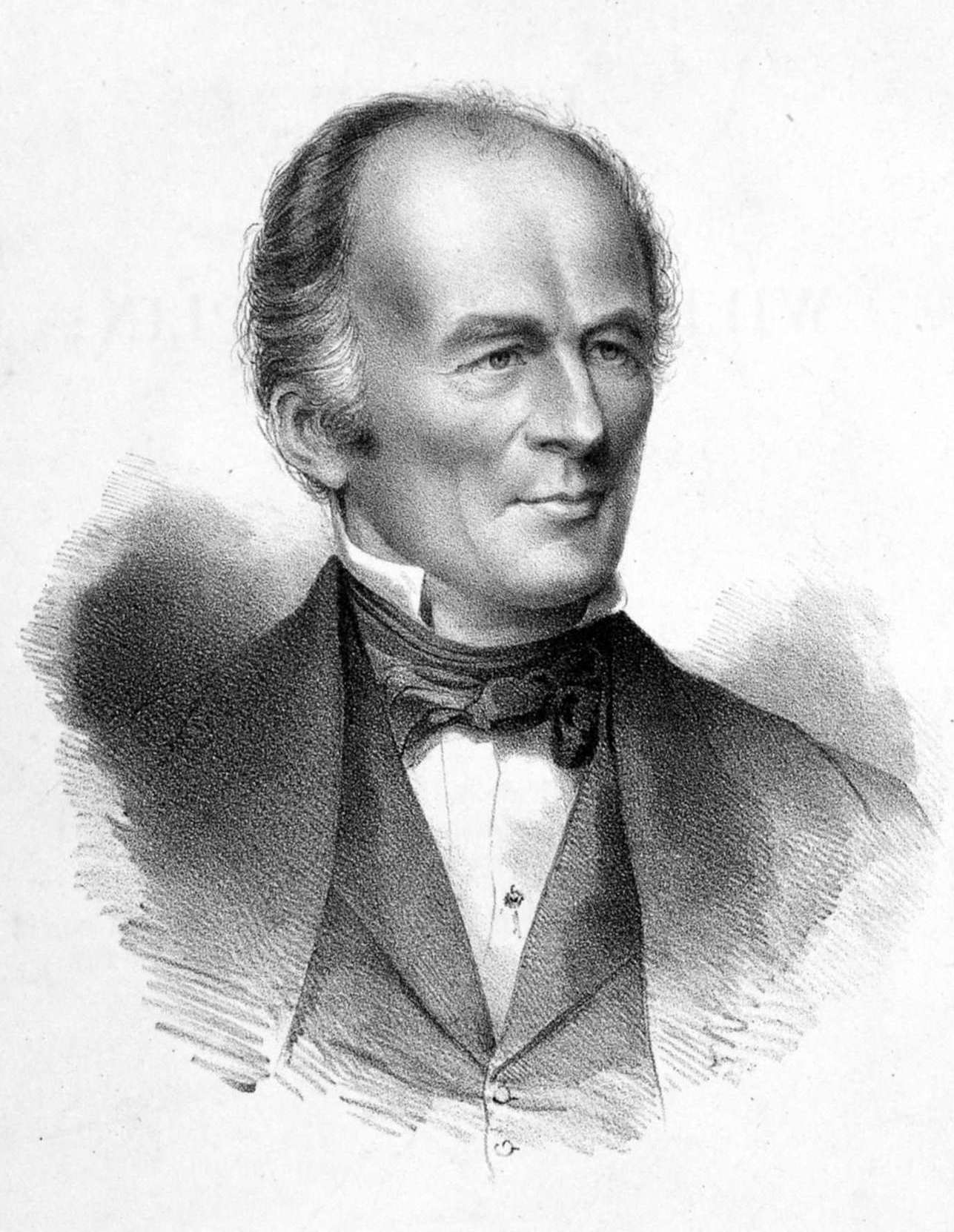
- William Lawrence Chaplin, c. 1851
- Born: October 27, 1796; Groton, Massachusetts
- Died: April 28, 1871 (aged 74); Cortland, New York, U.S.
- Occupations: Abolitionist, lawyer
- Known for: Underground Railroad general agent, Liberty Party candidate for lieutenant governor and then governor
- Spouse: Theodosia Gilbert Chaplin
- Children: 2

William Lawrence Chaplin (October 27, 1796 – April 28, 1871) was an abolitionist in the years before the American Civil War. Known by the title of "General", he was an agent for the American Anti-Slavery Society and a general agent for the Underground Railroad. He was imprisoned for the attempted escape of two individuals, which required $25,000 to get out of jail and safely out of Maryland. He was an editor at two anti-slavery newspapers and he was a Harvard-educated lawyer for a couple of years. He and his wife operated the Glen Haven Water Cure spa in their later years.

== Personal life ==
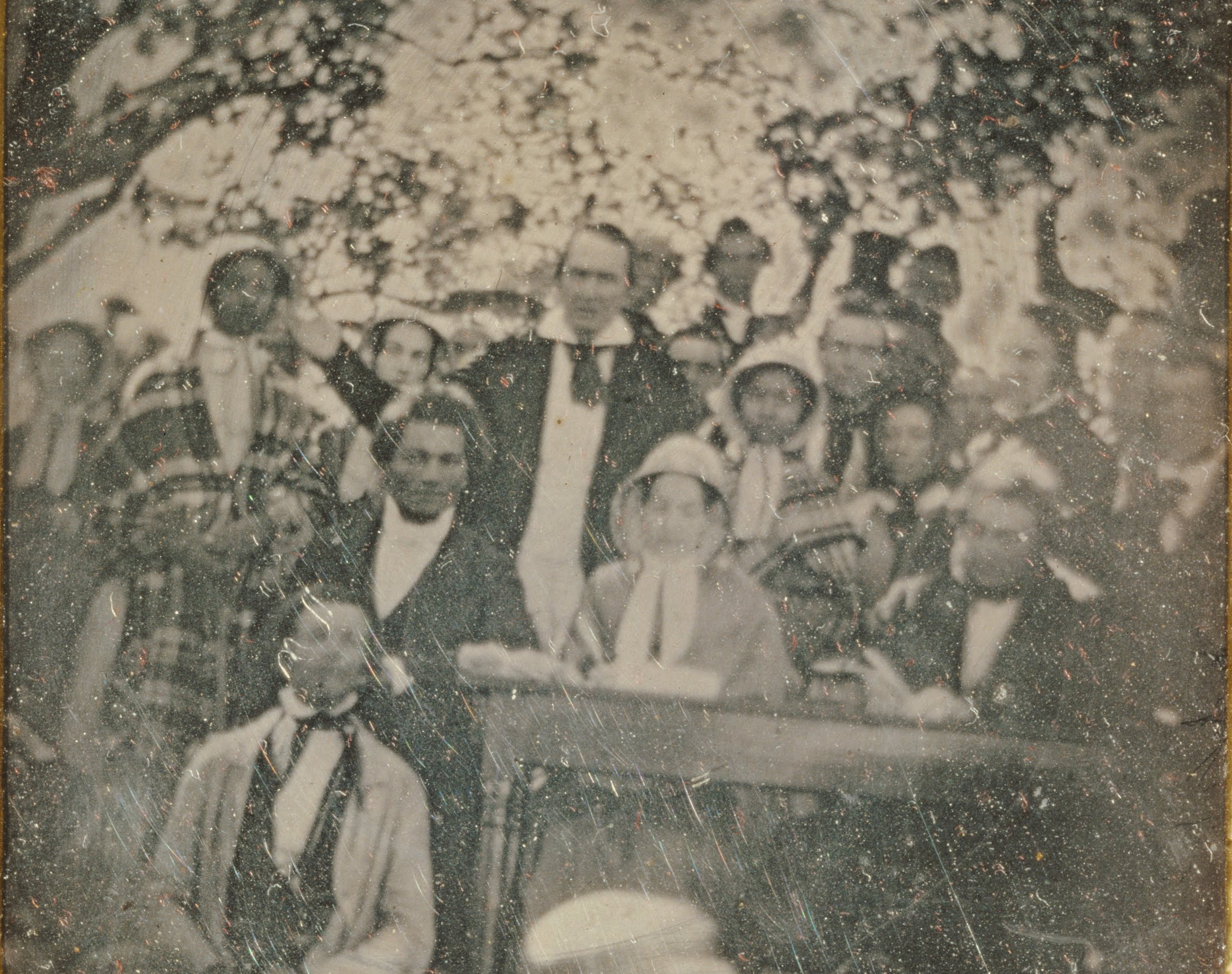
Theodosia Gilbert Chaplin (center, seated at table) is shown in this daguerreotype made at the Fugitive Slave Convention, Cazenovia, New York, in 1850, a year before she married William L. Chaplin. To her right is Frederick Douglass. Behind them (standing) is Gerrit Smith. On either side of Smith are Emily and Mary Edmonson, young women who had been fugitive slaves on the Pearl.

Chaplin was born on October 27, 1796, in Groton, Massachusetts. He was the son of Daniel Chaplin, a Congregationalist minister and Susanna Prescott Chaplin. His maternal grandfather was Col. William Prescott, a commander at the Battle of Bunker Hill.

Beginning in 1804, he was educated at Andover Academy and he attended Harvard College in 1819, under the preceptorship of Mr. Butler. He attended Harvard for four years, but did not graduate. During his senior year, a group of 34 students, that did not include Chaplin, initiated a rebellion that caused them to be dismissed. Chaplin withdrew under his own counsel. He studied law under Judge Dana and he was admitted to the bar in June 1829.

He was married to Theodosia Gilbert at Glen Haven, New York, on August 12, 1851. Gilbert was the daughter of Betsey (née Green) and Deacon Elias Gilbert of Richmond, New York. They had two children: Harriet Lawrence was born on December 5, 1852, and died nine years later on December 21, 1861. Theodosia Gilbert, born on April 11, 1855, married Reverend Frederick John Clegg Walton. They attended the First Congregational Church of Pittsfield led by Rev. John Todd.

== Career and activism ==
Chaplin advocated for temperance beginning in 1819. From 1829 until 1837, Chaplin was a practicing attorney in Groton and Easton, Massachusetts. He became an abolitionist by 1833 when he joined the newly formed American Anti-Slavery Society. He left his law practice to focus his efforts towards abolition of slavery. In 1837, he moved to Utica, New York, where he became a general agent of the New York Anti-Slavery Society. Among fellow abolitionists, he was known as "General Chaplin". He was the editor of the anti-slavery newspapers the American Citizen and the Albany Patriot, where he was also the Washington, D.C. correspondent.

He joined a group headed by Gerrit Smith that formed the Liberty Party in 1840. They were radical political abolitionists. He was a Liberty Party candidate for lieutenant governor of New York in 1846 and for governor of New York in 1850.

== Underground Railroad and arrest ==
In 1846, he moved to Washington, D.C., and filled the position left by Charles Turner Torrey when he died in prison that year; Chaplin became an agent for the Underground Railroad. The Vigilance Committee provided funding for purchasing enslaved blacks and for the rescue of fugitive slaves. With Daniel Bell, a free black man, he organized and financed the attempted escape of 77 slaves from Washington, D.C., in the Pearl incident in 1848 and numerous other rescues of slaves. For instance, in November 1848 he negotiate the payment to free the Mary and Elizabeth Edmonson, who were fugitives during the Pearl incident.

Chaplin and other abolitionists yearned for more meaningful roles in the fight against slavery. In December 1848, Chaplin made a call for direct action: "to storm the castle of tyranny and rescue from its cruel grasp its bruised and peeled victims". In 1849 or 1850, Chaplin helped Anna Maria Weems's sister Mary Jane (Stella) Weems and the Young family (Mary Jane's aunt, uncle and cousins) successfully escape slavery.

In August 1850, Chaplin was arrested for aiding in the escape of two slaves, Allen and Garland H. White, (Note: After later escaping, Garland was the chaplain of the 28th United States Colored Infantry Regiment during the Civil War. The marker for the incident erroneously states that it was Allen who was the chaplain. Prince and others state that the two fugitives were Allen and Garland. Scoggins states that the escapees were Louisa and Garland.) who were owned by then-congressmen Alexander Hamilton Stephens (Note: Stephens was later vice president of the Confederate States of America.) and Robert Toombs of Georgia, respectively. (Note: The Liberator states that the events took place in August 1849, but says Chaplin was under arrest in October 1850.) They left Washington, D.C., and were held at the home of General Walter Jones for "some time". A $500 reward was set for both slaves and John H. Goddard, the pro-slavery captain of the night guard and police magistrate, was hired to search for them. Based upon a tip, Goddard and his posse waited for the escapees, who had been picked up by a carriage and taken to the Maryland-Pennsylvania border. The carriage was ambushed on the Washington-Brookeville Pike (now Georgia Avenue) in Silver Spring, Maryland. Chaplin was hit with a club (Note: At some point during the incident or his arrest, Chaplin had been treated with "great cruelty and indignity".) and shots were fired into the carriage, wounding Allen and Garland. Allen was captured and Garland escaped but surrendered after a few days. (Note: Scroggins states that both were caught when a posse of six slave catchers chased Chaplin's carriage out of Washington. During the chase, the posse shot into the carriage, wounding the occupants.)

Chaplin was held in jail starting on April 8, 1850,^{but his crime was in August} with six weeks in District of Columbia and then transferred to the jail in Rockville, Maryland, for another 13 weeks. Monies to pay for his bail and defense were acquired through donations to the Chaplin Fund Committee. (Note: Chaplin was said to have been charged under the Fugitive Slave Act of 1850, but Chaplin was arrested in August 1850 and the Act was created in September 1850.) Chaplin was bailed out for $19,000 and for a total of $25,000 to ensure that he was not lynched while leaving the state. The bail and defense payments were paid by prominent abolitionist Gerrit Smith and others. The money was forfeited as Chaplin skipped bail and returned to New York. Some people were left penniless after making the donations. Chaplin performed anti-slavery lectures to attain money to recoup donations to his bail fund. The events were recorded in a pamphlet entitled The Case of William L. Chaplin; being an Appeal to all Respecters of Law and Justice against the cruel and oppressive treatment to which, under color of legal proceedings, he has been subjected, in the District of Columbia and the State of Maryland.

Chaplin's minister, Rev. John Todd, defended him in the October 30, 1850, issue of The New York Evangelist. Todd said that Chaplin had "one of the noblest, most self-sacrificing, unselfish hearts that ever beat in human bosom." A historical marker at the Howard County Courthouse in Ellicott City, Maryland, states that it:

was the location for judicial proceedings related to legal cases involving those charged with encouraging enslaved persons to run away... Arguably, the most famous case involved the transfer of known Underground Railroad agent William L. Chaplin of New York from Montgomery County to Howard County in 1850 but there were many cases involving local free Blacks like that of Warner Cook, charged with enticing those enslaved to run away.

Anticipating the Fugitive Slave Act of 1850, the Cazenovia convention was held on August 21 and 22, 1850, in Cazenovia, New York. It was organized by Charles Bennett Ray and Gerrit Smith of the New York State Vigilance Association and attended by Frederick Douglass and Mary and Elizabeth Edmonson, who were fugitives during the Pearl incident and subsequently ran away. There were some 30 fugitive slaves that attended the convention. Chaplin was held in a jail, so his fiancé, Theodosia Gilbert, attended in his stead.

James C. Jackson, Joseph C. Hathaway, and Chaplin split from other abolitionists and joined the Free Democratic party.

== Post-arrest years ==
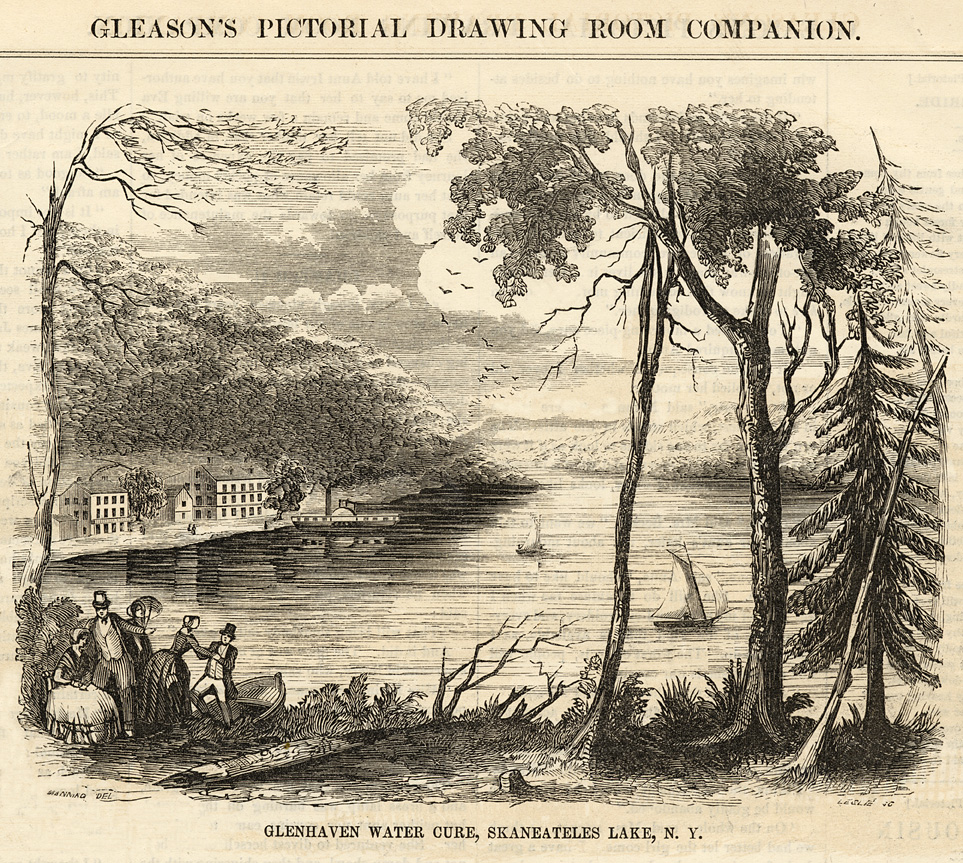
Glen Haven Water Cure on Skaneateles Lake, New York

In 1851, William L. Chaplin joined his wife and James C. Jackson in operating the Glen Haven Water Cure spa, where Chaplin and Theodosia Gilbert were married on August 12, 1851. (Note: The Douglass book states they were married on April 13, but Gilbert and Chaplin were recorded to have been married on April 12, by Green and a marriage announcement from the Skaneateles Columbian newspaper.) Theodosia died on April 11, 1855, after the birth of her second child. He died at his home on April 28, 1871, in Cortland County, New York. Harriet, Theodosia, and William were buried at the Cortland Rural Cemetery.
