= Daniel Bell (disambiguation) =

Daniel Bell (1919–2011) was an American sociologist and professor at Harvard University.

Daniel Bell may also refer to:

- Daniel Bell (Australian swimmer) (born 1984), Australian Paralympic swimmer
- Daniel Bell (footballer) (born 1985), Australian rules footballer
- Daniel Bell (freedman) (c. 1802–1877), American freed slave who helped plan the Pearl incident
- Daniel Bell (musician) (born 1967), American minimal techno disc jockey
- Daniel Bell (field hockey) (born 1994), South Africa field hockey player
- Daniel Bell (New Zealand swimmer) (born 1990), New Zealand Olympic swimmer
- Daniel A. Bell (born 1964), Canadian political scientist
- Daniel W. Bell (1891–1971), American civil servant and businessman
- Dan Bell (born 1977), American filmmaker

== See also ==
- Daniel Bell Wakefield (1798–1858), New Zealand judge
- Daniel Bell-Drummond (born 1993), English cricketer
- Daniel Belle (born 1983), Australian Idol contestant
