= John H. Paynter =

American poet

John H. Paynter (1862–1947) was an African American writer of poetry and nonfiction who wrote the book Fugitives of the Pearl (1930), a popular history of the largest known mass escape attempt of enslaved people in the United States. The story was based on his own 1916 short story first published in The Journal of Negro History and then published as a serial in the Washington Tribune, written based on news accounts and oral histories from his own family. He was a descendant of the Edmonson sisters, three sisters who attempted to escape slavery on The Pearl, and a grandson of John and Elizabeth Edmonson Brent, who were born slaves and purchased their own freedom before founding the John Wesley A.M.E. Zion Church at 14th and Corcoran streets NW in Washington, D.C.

In his autobiographical Joining the Navy, or Abroad with Uncle Sam, Paynter wrote of his experiences after enlisting as a cabin boy in the U.S. Navy in 1884, when there were limited opportunities for advancement for African Americans. W.E.B. DuBois wrote a foreword to the book.

Paynter was also a real estate investor and chair of the board of directors of Universal Development and Loan Co., which built Suburban Gardens, a seven-acre amusement park opened in 1921 in Washington D.C. Suburban Gardens admitted African Americans at a time when the Glen Echo Amusement Park in nearby Maryland was segregated.
