= Daniel Bell (freedman) =

19th-century freed American slave

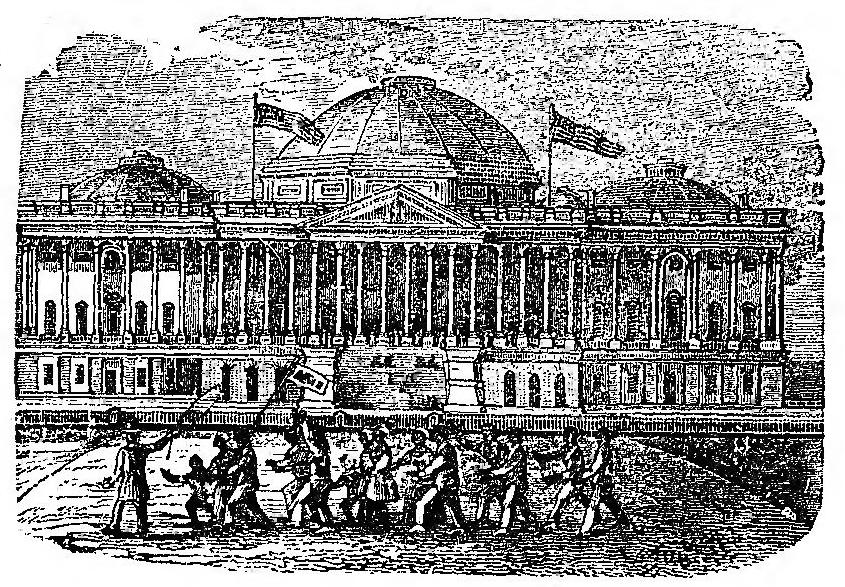
Image from the cover of Slavery and the slave trade at the nation's capital, 1846, William Harned, New York.

Daniel Bell (ca. 1802 – March 1877) was a formerly enslaved man who gained his freedom and then sought the freedom of his wife, Mary, and their children. Due to a series of unfortunate events, it took decades for the Bell family to obtain their freedom. Daniel and his wife had both been enslaved again after they had obtained their freedom. Two of their children who were born free were enslaved.

Bell was an organizer and fundraiser for what was called "the single largest known escape attempt by enslaved Americans", by Vincent DeFort, a Washington, D.C., resident of the National Park Service. Having been thwarted many times by the court system and their slaveholder's behavior, the Bells were prevented from attaining their freedom. Bell helped plan the use of a schooner, the Pearl, to transport his family north from Washington, D.C., in 1848. The plan expanded to carry a total of 77 fugitive slaves on the schooner. Two days after their flight, the schooner was overtaken and Bell family members were taken back to the District of Columbia and held in a slave pen for sale. Bell was able to pay for the freedom of Mary and two of his children, before the remaining children were spread out across the slave-holding states, including Louisiana and Mississippi in the Deep South.

Some of his children were never found, some were found after the Civil War, and some died by 1870. A daughter and granddaughter were freed by the Compensated Emancipation Act of 1862 for residents of Washington, D.C. The Emancipation Proclamation was ratified on December 6, 1865 that made any remaining enslaved relatives free. Bell and his wife settled in Washington, D.C.

== Early years ==
Born about 1802 in Prince George's County, Maryland, Daniel Bell, the son of Lucy Bell (born ca. 1763 in Maryland), was born into slavery. He and his sisters were initially owned by Ann Greenfield, the widow of Gerrard Truman Greenfield. After Ann's death in 1810, Daniel and his sister Harriet went to Ann's son Gabriel Greenfield, who died in 1815. He may have lived with his mother and two sisters in the District of Columbia near the Navy Yard by 1820.

His mother, Lucy, obtained her freedom by 1850. She died on June 8, 1862, and was buried in the Congressional Cemetery in Washington, D.C. (Note: His sister, Ann died in 1873 and is buried with their mother.)

== Adulthood ==
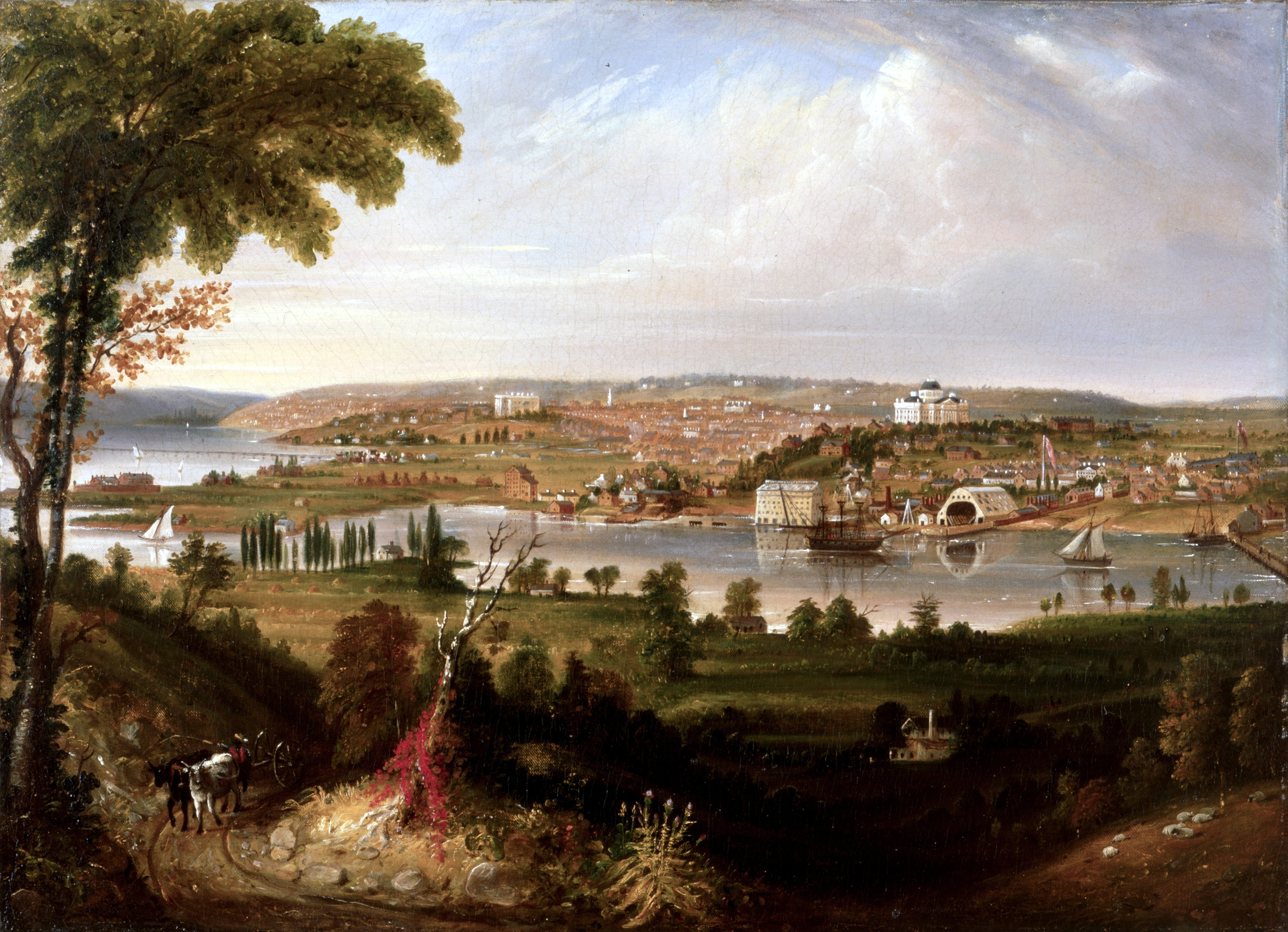
George Cooke, City of Washington from Beyond the Navy Yard, 1833

Loaned out to work for the government by his slaveholder, Bell worked in the Navy Yard's blacksmith shop casting and moulding heavy ironworks. He worked there beginning about 1828 and through at least until 1848. He was described as "robust, worthy, [and] industrious".

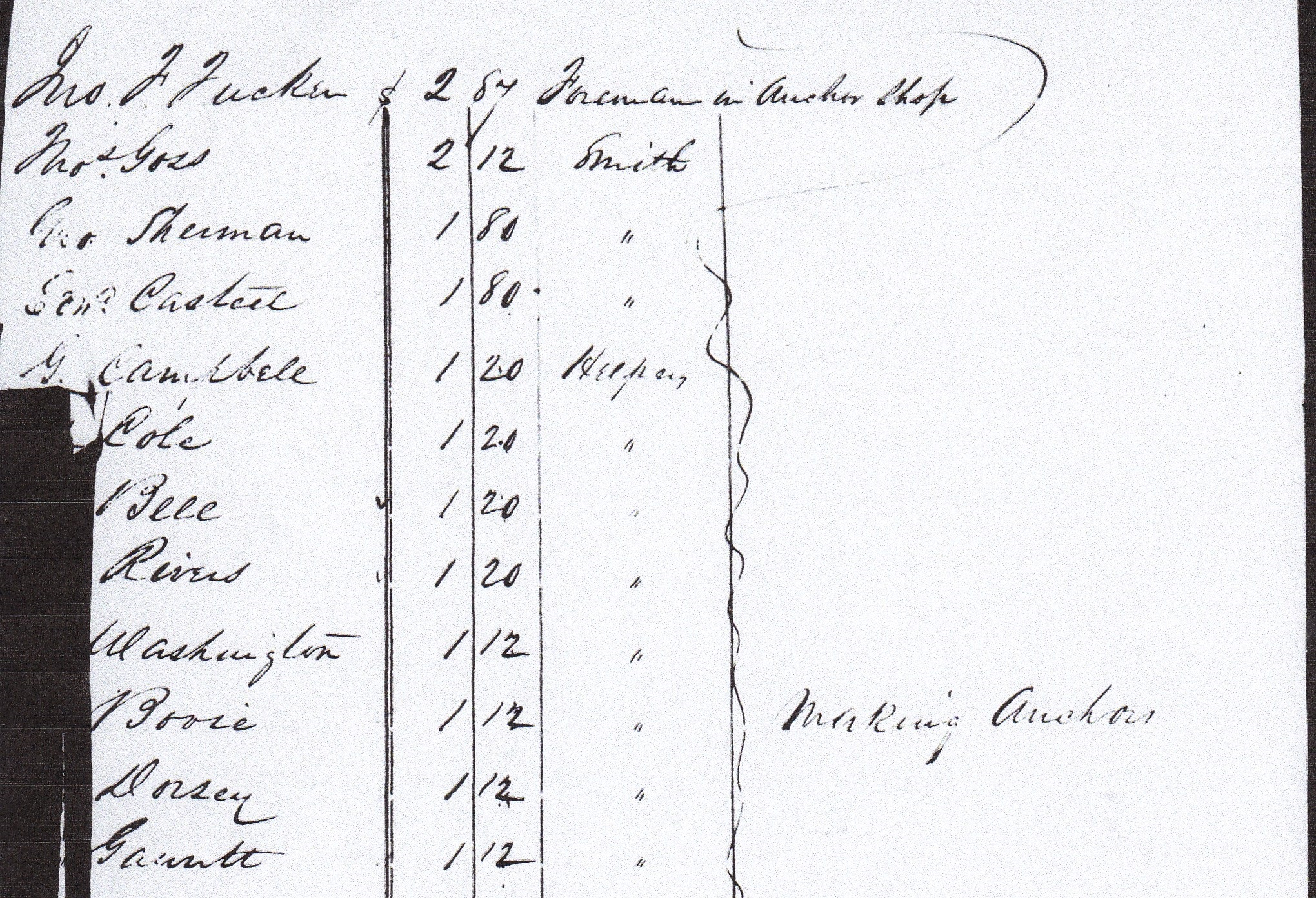
Daniel Bell, blacksmith helper, wage a $ 1.20 per day, Washington Navy Yard, Anchor Shop. Bell is the 7th line down, on this list of all persons employed WNY,1 Jan to 31 Dec 1844, p 7

He married Mary, who was enslaved by Robert and Susannah (Susan) Armstead or Armistead. By 1835, Bell and Mary had six children who were between the ages of eleven years old to the youngest who was three months old, in descending order by age: Andrew, Mary Ellen, Caroline, George W., Daniel, and Harriet. Mary and her children were owned by Armistead, and Mary was promised by her slaveholder that her children would achieve freedom when they were 25 years of age.

== Bell family's disposition ==
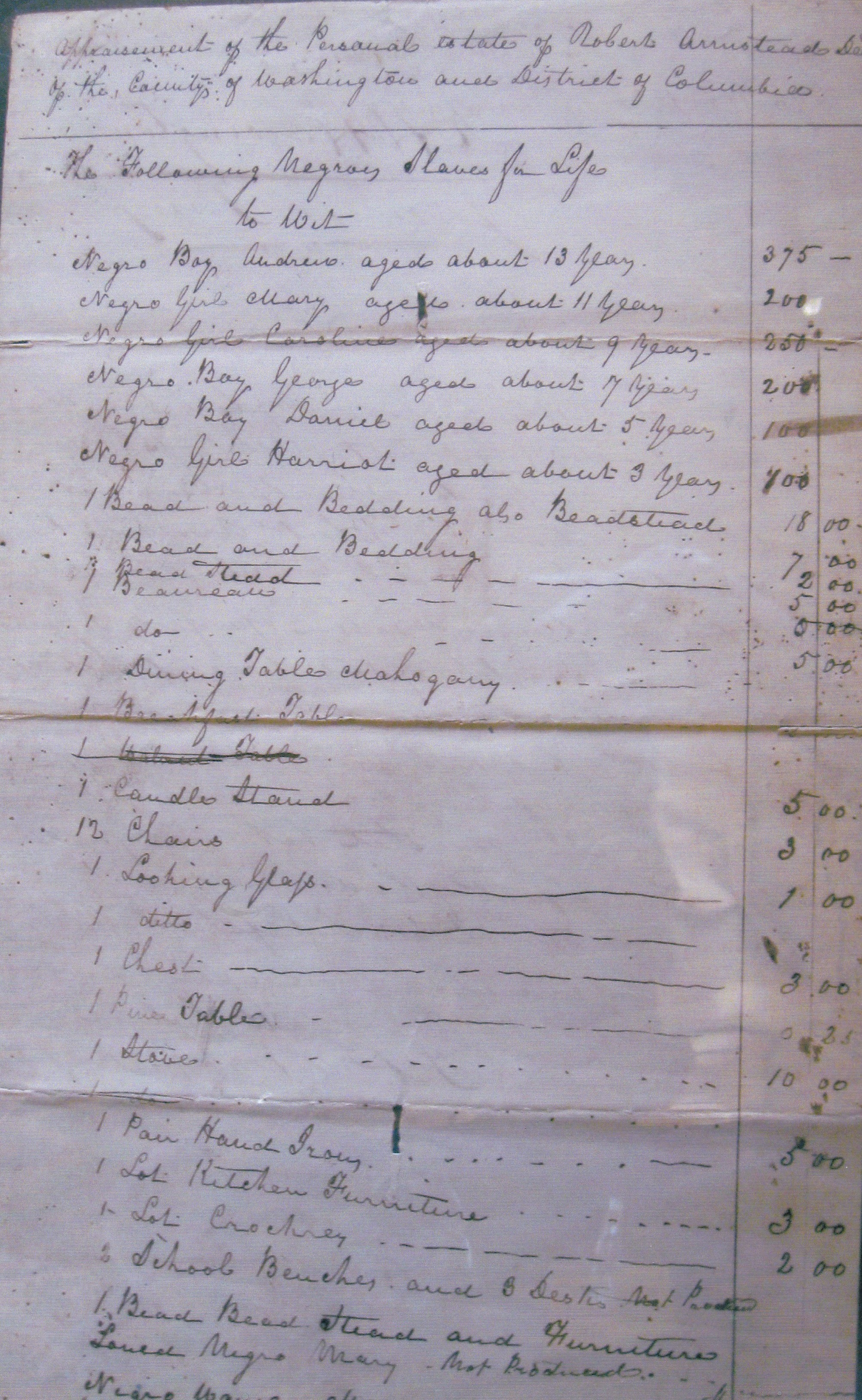
1832 appraisal of the estate of Robert Armistead listing the enslaved children of Daniel and Mary Bell and their appraised valuation. Mary Bell is mentioned at the bottom of the document. National Archives and Records Administration (NARA) RG21

=== Mary ===
On September 14, 1835, Robert Armistead signed a deed of manumission to free Mary upon his death, but stipulated that her children should not be freed until they were 30 to 40 years of age. (Note: The girls were to serve until 30 years of age, the boys 35 years, except Andrew who was not to be freed until he was 40 years of age.) Armistead died around two days later, and the document was filed at the court, but his widow did not honor the agreement. Widow Susan Armistead provided a statement that she owned the Bell children for life. The deed of manumission was processed by a clerk of Washington County, Maryland and Mary Bell was given her freedom papers on September 21, 1835. Susan, however, contested her husband's manumission deed, stating that he was of unsound mind and coerced into signing. Mary had to obtain her freedom again. Thomas Blagden purchased her freedom, and that of one child, for $400 in about the spring of 1847, and the amount was reimbursed by abolitionists. However, in December 1847, the court decided against Mary's petition for freedom.

=== Daniel ===
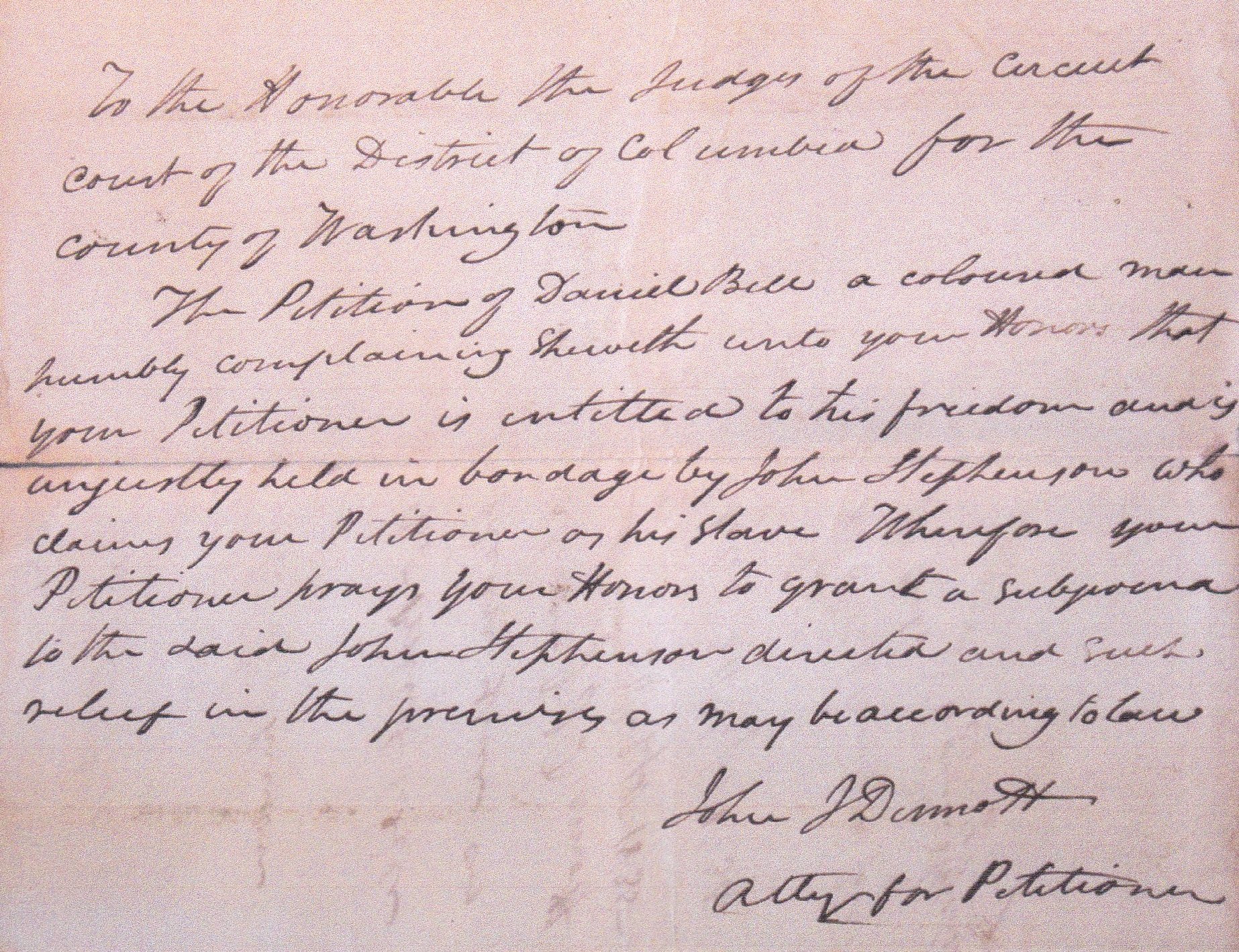
Daniel Bell v John Stephenson petition of freedom, September 24, 1835

When Bell's slaveholder heard that Mary was freed and her children were to be freed by term slavery, he or she made arrangements with a slave trader who seized Bell, took him to Seventh Avenue, and placed in a slave pen to wait to be sold. His wife, children, and friends were distressed. Through his lawyers, Bell petitioned for his freedom on September 24, 1835. Bell's lawyer withdrew the petition after a colonel agreed to buy Bell, and receive payments in return for his freedom. The arrangements were made through abolitionists to buy Bell, and have him reimburse the purchase price in payments over time. Bell had paid off nearly all of the $1,000 (equivalent to $31,210 in 2025) loan when the colonel died. Unknown to Bell, the colonel had financed a loan for $1,000 from his sister-in-law. The colonel's heirs wanted the full $1,000, but the amount was negotiated down to about $600 by Thomas Blagden. Between the colonel and the colonel's beneficiary(ies), Bell made a total of $1,630 (equivalent to $50,872 in 2025) in payments and received his freedom papers in 1847. (Note: Bell had receipts for $1,030 of the payments.)

=== The Bell children ===
Armistead's estate was valued at $1,299.25, of which $1,225 was the total value for the Bell children. Based on Susan Armistead's account of Bell's family in 1839—Andrew, Mary Ellen, and Caroline—the oldest children, were hired out. Their wages were used to support the Armisteads. The other Bell children were George, Daniel, and Harriet. Of the children, Caroline, George and Harriet were said to have lived with Susan. (Note: 40-year-old Mary was listed as "not produced," on Susan's inventory and with the comment that furniture had been loaned to her. Bell was not listed, because he was not owned by the Armisteads at that time.) Eight years after Mary obtained her freedom and bore two more children, Susan continued to try to obtain clear ownership of all of the Bell children. She accepted the money that they earned, and neglected their care, leaving them without proper clothes. Susan took baby Eleanor, who was born free, and kept her in an unknown location.

== Flight ==
Even though Mary and Daniel had their freedom papers, Bell had twelve family members (Note: The Green-Mountain Freeman states that the Bells had eight children in 1848. Pacheco stated that they had twelve family members in 1848, which included eight children and two grandchildren. The other two family members could have been Mary and Daniel, or two spouses of their children.) who were enslaved by the time that he determined that the family could not ensure their freedom. It was likely that they could be taken captive again and returned to slavery, or face defeat in the court system. He went to Philadelphia to try to obtain the money that he needed to buy his family members from servitude, but he was unsuccessful. With Samuel Edmonson, brother of the Edmonson sisters, Bell then began planning for a way to get his family out of the D.C. area with William L. Chaplin, the general agent of the Underground Railroad.

External images
- The Pearl schooner
- The Pearl captured (map)

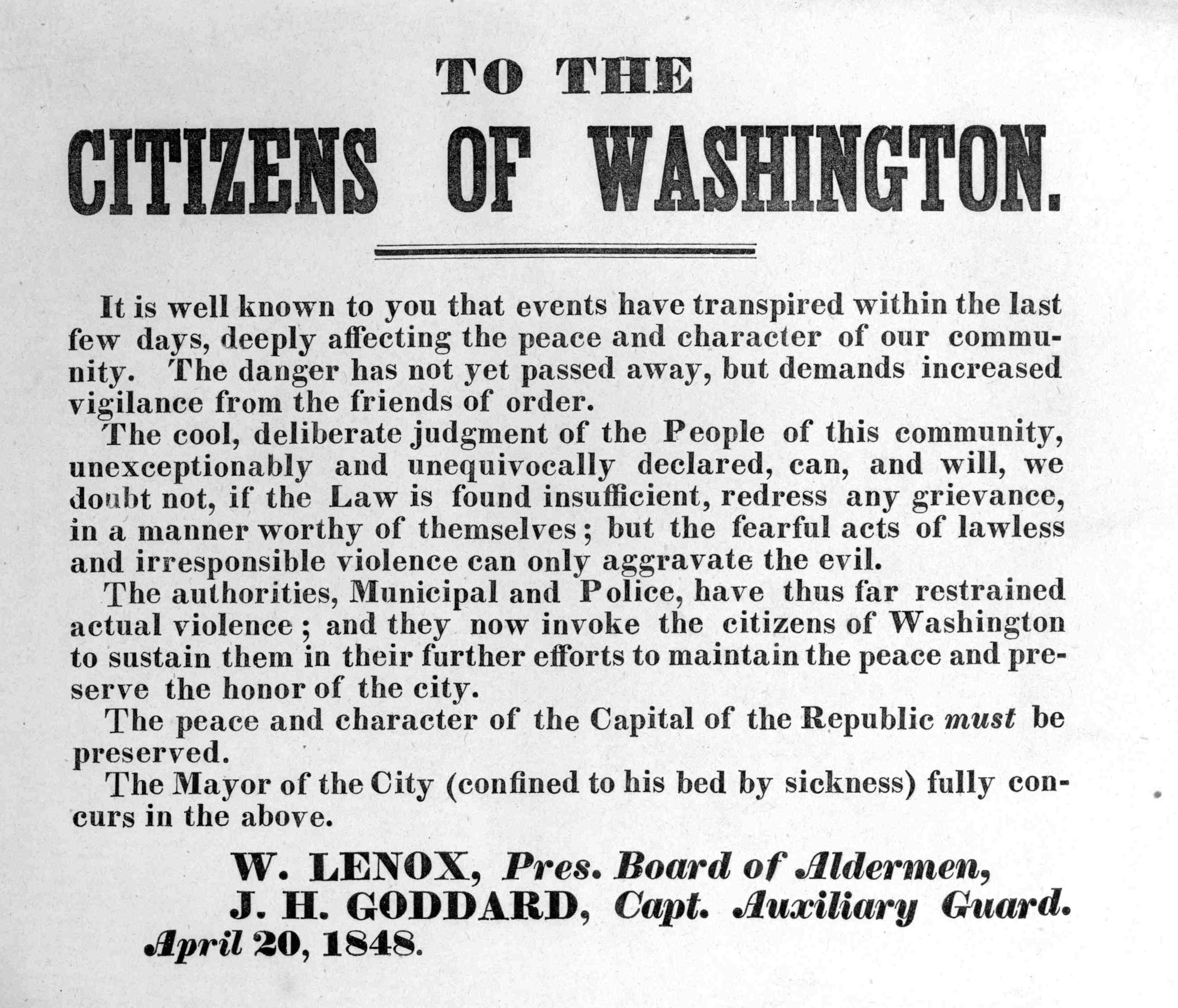
This 1848 poster was made by the District of Columbia government to warn alarmed white citizens fearing a slave revolt, not to riot or commit acts of violence. The poster was in response to public concern and rumors of a slave uprising, following Pearl incident.

They planned on using a schooner, the Pearl, to transport the Bell family north from Washington, D.C., to Frenchtown, New Jersey. The vessel was docked in a secluded area by Seventh Avenue. The plan became more harrowing when the decision was made to transport more individuals and families, resulting in a total of 77 fugitive slaves. They began their journey on April 15, 1848, but had to anchor near Point Lookout, Maryland due to headwinds. They were apprehended after slaveholders learned of the plan and caught up with them in a steamer. The fugitives were taken back to D.C. where they were met by an angry crowd, that led to the Washington riot of 1848. After being held, the fugitives were transported and sold to places in the area—Richmond, Annapolis, and Baltimore—and to southern states.

Mary was among the group of 50 adults and children that were transported via railroad train from Washington, D.C., to Baltimore to be sold on April 21, 1848. Daniel had tried to stop the train, telling the slave dealer that Mary was a free woman and that he had her freedom papers. Daniel was unable to get her from the train. He was only able to get enough money to buy the freedom of Mary, their son Thomas, and another child. Most of his children were sold and transported south, such as to Mississippi and Louisiana. (Note: Green-Mountain Freeman states that Mary and one child were purchased for $400. Nash states that Mary and two children were purchased.)

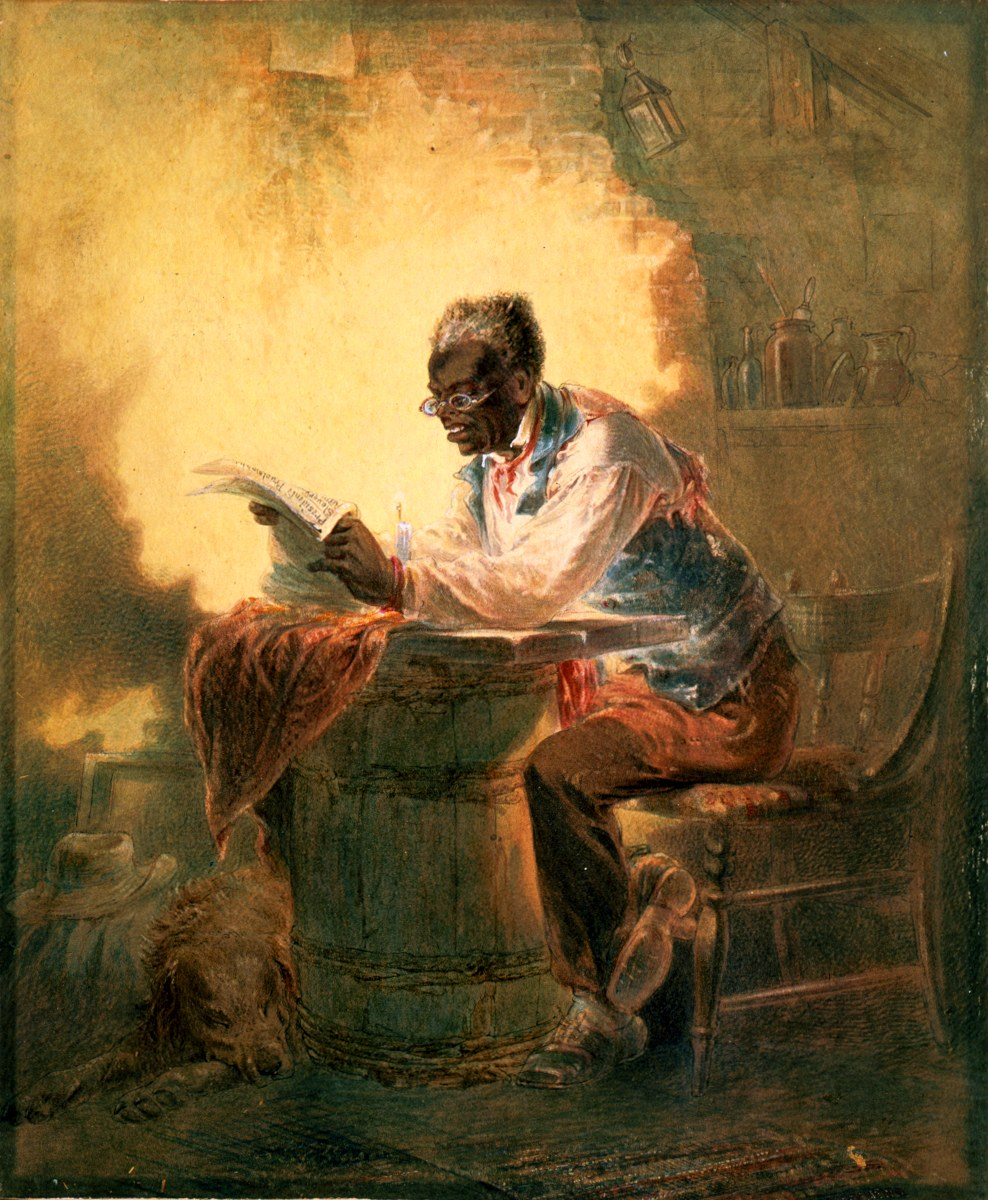
Henry Lewis Stephens, untitled watercolor of a black man reading a newspaper with headline "Presidential Proclamation/Slavery", ca. 1863. Several of Bell's children were not freed until the enactment of the Emancipation Proclamation

The outcomes of the eight Bell children are:

- Andrew was not found after his sale in 1848 following the Pearl incident.
- Mary Ellen was sold to a slaveholder in western Mississippi. She married Jordan Dawley, who served in the 2nd Mississippi Infantry (African Descent) of the Union Army. He died of pneumonia on January 20, 1864. Mary Ellen was then a widow with four children. After the war, Mary Ellen let her parents know of her circumstances. She remarried and lived in western Mississippi with her husband, Alex Robinson or Robertson.
- Caroline had a daughter Catherine and son John at the time of the Pearl escape. It is not known what became of them. Caroline eventually married John Green, and lived with her mother after her father's death.
- George W. was not found after his sale in 1848.
- Daniel Jr. was sold to a slaveholder in Louisiana. He is believed to have reconnected with his parents after the war. He lived in Natchitoches, Louisiana with his wife, Louisa Franklin, and eight children.
- Harriet (Note: Harriet petitioned for her freedom in 1846 in the Harriet Bell v. Susan Armistead case.) was married to Thomas Snow and had four children before she died between 1870 and 1875.
- Eleanor (Nora) was born free, but in 1849 she lost her petition against Susan Armistead. She was gifted in February 1862 to Sarah Jane (Armistead) O'Brien. She and her 6-month-old daughter Caroline were freed by the Compensated Emancipation Act of 1862 for the residents of Washington, D.C., She had no more children and was believed to have died by 1870 when Caroline lived with Ann Bell, her great-aunt, but definitively by 1875.
- Thomas appears to have been born around 1845 in the District of Columbia. He was five years old and lived with his parents in 1850. His whereabouts are unknown since that time.

Daniel, Mary and Thomas Bell shared a house with his sister Ann Bell, his mother Lucy Bell, John Ash, Anthony Ash, and Phebe Dorsey in Washington, D.C., in 1850. He was still in the District of Columbia in 1870.

== Later years and death ==
Upon his death in March 1877, Bell left his estate to his wife, who he said was his "well beloved and devoted wife, Mary". She lived in their house in Washington, D.C., with her daughter Caroline and her son-in-law. Daniel Bell stipulated in his will of 1875 that after Mary died the estate should be left to their children Caroline, Daniel, and Mary Ellen and their grandchildren Harriet and Elenora. Mary died in 1884.

== See also ==
- Edmonson sisters, whose story was sometimes told in combination with the Bell family
