= Ezra Greenleaf Weld =

American photographer

Ezra Weld
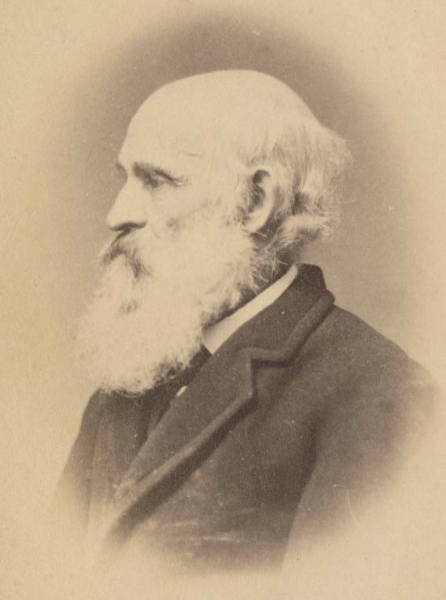
- Born: Ezra Greenleaf Weld; October 26, 1801; Hampton, Connecticut, U.S.
- Died: October 14, 1874 (72); Cazenovia, New York, U.S.
- Resting place: Evergreen Cemetery, Cazenovia, New York.
- Occupations: Photographer, Abolitionist
- Parent(s): Ludovicus Weld; Elizabeth Clark

Ezra Greenleaf Weld (October 26, 1801 – October 14, 1874), often known simply as "Greenleaf", was a photographer and an operator of a daguerreotype studio in Cazenovia, New York. He and his family were involved with the abolitionist movement.

== Family ==
Greenleaf was the son of Ludovicus Weld and Elizabeth (Clark) Weld. His brother was Theodore Dwight Weld, one of the most important abolitionists of his era. These Welds are all members of the very notable Weld Family of New England and share ancestry with Tuesday Weld, William Weld, and others.

== Personal life ==
Weld was born in Hampton, Connecticut, and lived there until 1825 when his family moved to Pompey, New York. He married Mary Ann Parker on August 16, 1827. Mary died on April 30, 1831, soon after giving birth to her second child. After moving to Cazenovia, Ezra remarried to Deborah Richmond Wood on April 12, 1840, and they later had four children.

== Photography ==
Weld opened his first studio in his home in 1845. In 1850, Cazenovia hosted the abolitionist meeting known as the Fugitive Slave Convention. This gave Weld the opportunity to photograph the legendary orator Frederick Douglass with the Edmonson sisters, Gerritt and Abby Kelley Foster. This daguerreotype was given to the imprisoned abolitionist William Chaplin who had helped many of the attendees escape to freedom.

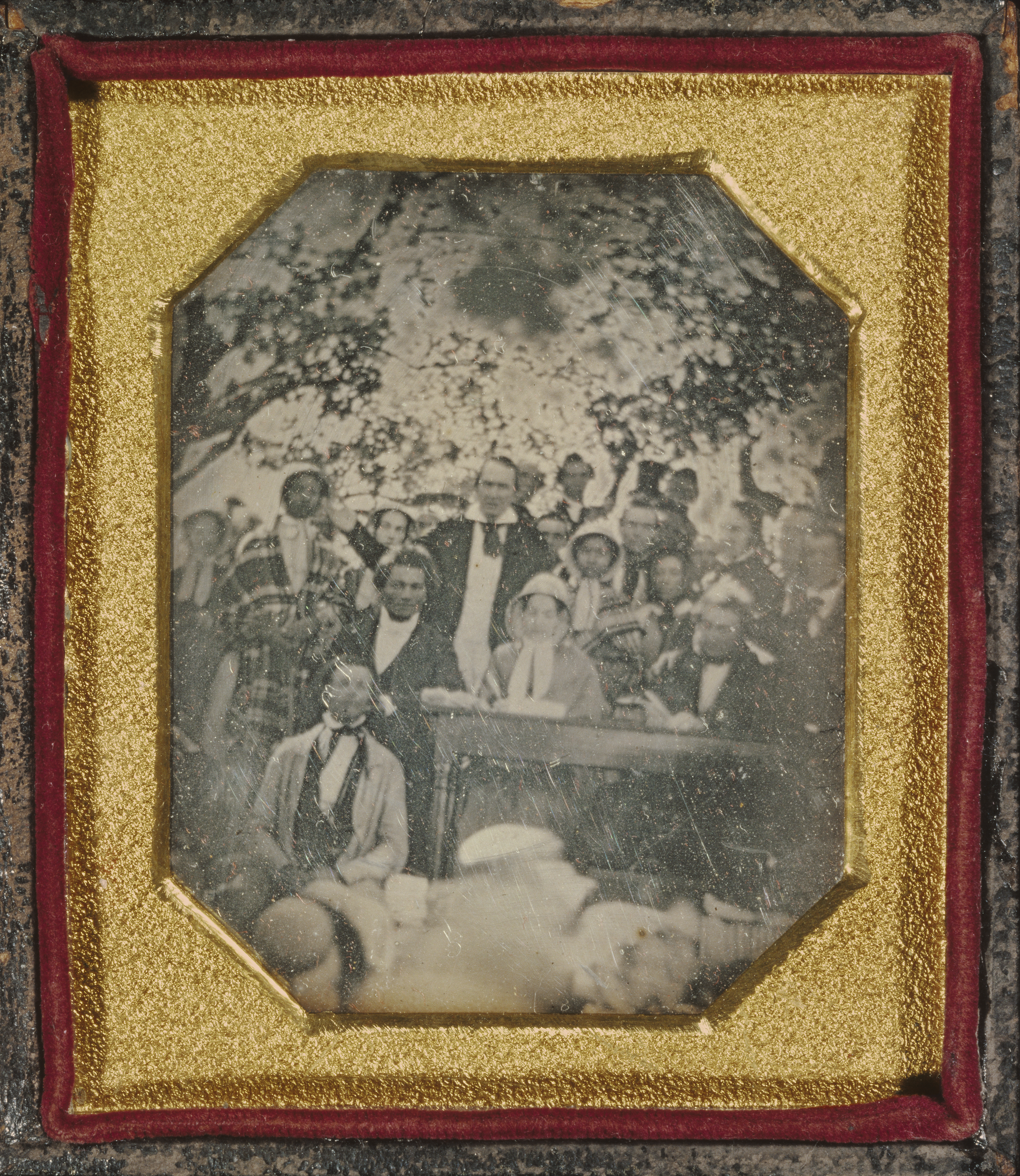
Weld daguerreotype taken at the 1850 Fugitive Slave Convention, Cazenovia, New York. The Edmonson sisters are standing wearing bonnets and shawls in the row behind the seated speakers. Frederick Douglass is seated, with Gerrit Smith standing behind him.

Of the six daguerreotypes of Douglass that have survived, only one besides Greenleaf's image has had its daguerreotypist identified. Greenleaf's image is unique because it is a group shot at an outdoor meeting rather than a studio portrait. Daguerreotypes were seldom attempted under these circumstances because the long exposure time required made it difficult to get a satisfactory result. Weld's is the only daguerreotype of Douglass whose date is known with certainty. This daguerreotype is also unique in the paradoxical sense that it is the only one known to have been copied. Two original half-plates exist: One is held by the Madison County Historical Society in Oneida, New York, the other is in a private collection and currently on display at the Smithsonian Institution in Washington, D.C. The copy (shown above) is in the J. Paul Getty Museum, Los Angeles, California.

In the New Englander, in a piece that survived only because Garrison reprinted it in The Liberator, he discussed his admiration for Douglass and desire to photograph him.

In the mid-18th century, most American towns had at least one studio. In an 1850 advertisement in his local newspaper, Greenleaf offered:

"Miniatures executed in the finest style, and put in Rings, Pins, Lockets and cases, of great variety size and price."

Greenleaf seems to have been very successful with his daguerreotype business. By 1851 he had leased new quarters on the top floor of a building, where he placed a skylight to receive northern light for his studio sessions. During the American Civil War years, he made numerous pictures in and around Cazenovia.

At some point, he included his son, Albert Weld, in his photography business and renamed the company E. G. Weld and Son. Ezra died on October 14, 1874, at Cazenovia and was buried in Evergreen Cemetery, Cazenovia, New York.
