= Suburban Gardens =

Major amusement park in Washington, D.C.

Coordinates: 38°54′0.2″N 76°55′46.5″W

Suburban Gardens was the first and only major amusement park within Washington, D.C. Located at 50th and Hayes Streets, NE, in the Deanwood neighborhood near the National Training School for Women and Girls, Suburban Gardens opened in 1921 and was in operation for almost two decades. It was a welcome site for African Americans who were excluded by whites from Glen Echo Amusement Park in nearby Maryland.

Suburban Gardens amusement park

Suburban Gardens was created by the Universal Development and Loan Company, a black-owned real estate and development company. Engineer Howard D. Woodson, writer John H. Paynter, and theater magnate Sherman H. Dudley were among the investors. Here Washingtonians enjoyed a roller coaster, Ferris wheel, swimming pools, games of chance, and picnic grounds. There was also a large dance pavilion where popular jazz musicians performed. The 7-acre (2.8 ha) park, in far Northeast, was on the city's undeveloped outskirts bordering Prince George's County, Maryland. Washingtonians and out-of-town visitors came to Suburban Gardens by trolley car, commuter train, private car, or on foot.

In 1928, white movie theater owner Abe Lichtman bought the park, who quickly began building of a movie theatre in Deanwood, in spite of the community protests against its construction.

The park closed by 1940. After its closure, the area was redeveloped and replaced mostly with apartment buildings, some of which share the park's name.

In 1960, African Americans joined with whites to engage in non-violent civil disobedience that finally ended the racist admissions policies of Glen Echo Amusement Park. Today, the Washington D.C. Metropolitan Police Department's Sixth District Station occupies part of the site of Suburban Gardens.

== Attractions ==
Suburban Gardens Amusement Park offered many attractions for its visitors. While the dance pavilion was considered the main attraction, Suburban Gardens also operated:

- A roller coaster
- A Ferris wheel
- A pool
- A caterpillar flat ride
- A chair swing ride
- Bumper cars
- A frolic spinning ride
- A tumble-bug ride
- A children’s playground.
