= Edmonson sisters =

19th-century African-American abolitionists

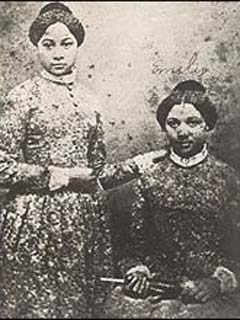
- Daguerreotype of Mary (standing) and Emily Edmonson (seated), shortly after they were freed in 1848
- Occupation: Abolitionists
- Known for: Participating in the Pearl incident; Being freed from slavery by Henry Ward Beecher and his congregation
- Mary Edmonson
- Born: 1832; Montgomery County, Maryland, US
- Died: 1853 (aged 20–21); Oberlin College, Oberlin, Ohio, US
- Emily Edmonson
- Born: 1835; Montgomery County, Maryland, US
- Died: September 15, 1895 (aged 59–60); Washington, D.C., US
- Spouse(s): Larkin Johnson (m. 1860)

Mary Edmonson (1832–1853) and Emily Edmonson (1835 – September 15, 1895), "two respectable young women of light complexion", were African Americans who became celebrities in the United States abolitionist movement after gaining their freedom from slavery. On April 15, 1848, they were among the 77 slaves who tried to escape from Washington, D.C., on the schooner The Pearl to sail up the Chesapeake Bay to freedom in New Jersey.

Although that effort failed, they were freed from slavery by funds raised by the Congregational Plymouth Church in Brooklyn, New York, whose pastor was Henry Ward Beecher, a prominent abolitionist. After gaining freedom, the Edmonsons were supported to go to school; they also worked. They campaigned with Beecher throughout the North for the end of slavery in the United States.

== Early life ==
The Edmonson sisters were the daughters of Paul and Amelia Edmonson, a free black man and an enslaved woman in Montgomery County, Maryland. Mary and Emily were two of 13 or 14 children who survived to adulthood, all of whom were born into slavery. Since the 17th century, law common to all slave states decreed that the children of an enslaved mother inherited their mother's legal status, by the principle of partus sequitur ventrem.

Their father, Paul Edmonson, was set free by his owner's will. Maryland was a state with a high percentage of free black people. Most descended from enslaved people freed in the first two decades after the American Revolution, when enslavers were encouraged to manumission by the principles of the war and activist Quaker and Methodist preachers. By 1810, more than 10 percent of black people in the Upper South were free, with most of them in Maryland and Delaware. By 1860, 49.7 percent of black people in Maryland were free.

Edmonson purchased land in the Norbeck area of Montgomery County, where he farmed and established his family. Amelia was allowed to live with her husband, but continued to work for her master. The couple's children began work at an early age as servants, laborers and skilled workers. From about the ages of 13 or 14, they were "hired out" to work in elite private homes in nearby Washington, D.C., under a type of lease arrangement, where their wages went to the slaveholder. This practice of "hiring out" grew from the shift away from the formerly labor-intensive tobacco plantation system, leaving planters in this part of the United States with surplus enslaved people. They hired out enslaved people or sold them to traders for the Deep South. Many enslaved people worked as servants in homes and hotels of the capital. Men were sometimes hired out as craftsmen, artisans or to work at the ports on the Potomac River.

By 1848 four of the older Edmonson sisters had bought their freedom (with the help of husbands and family), but the master had decided against allowing any more of the siblings to do so. Six were hired out for his benefit, including the two youngest sisters.

== Escape attempt ==
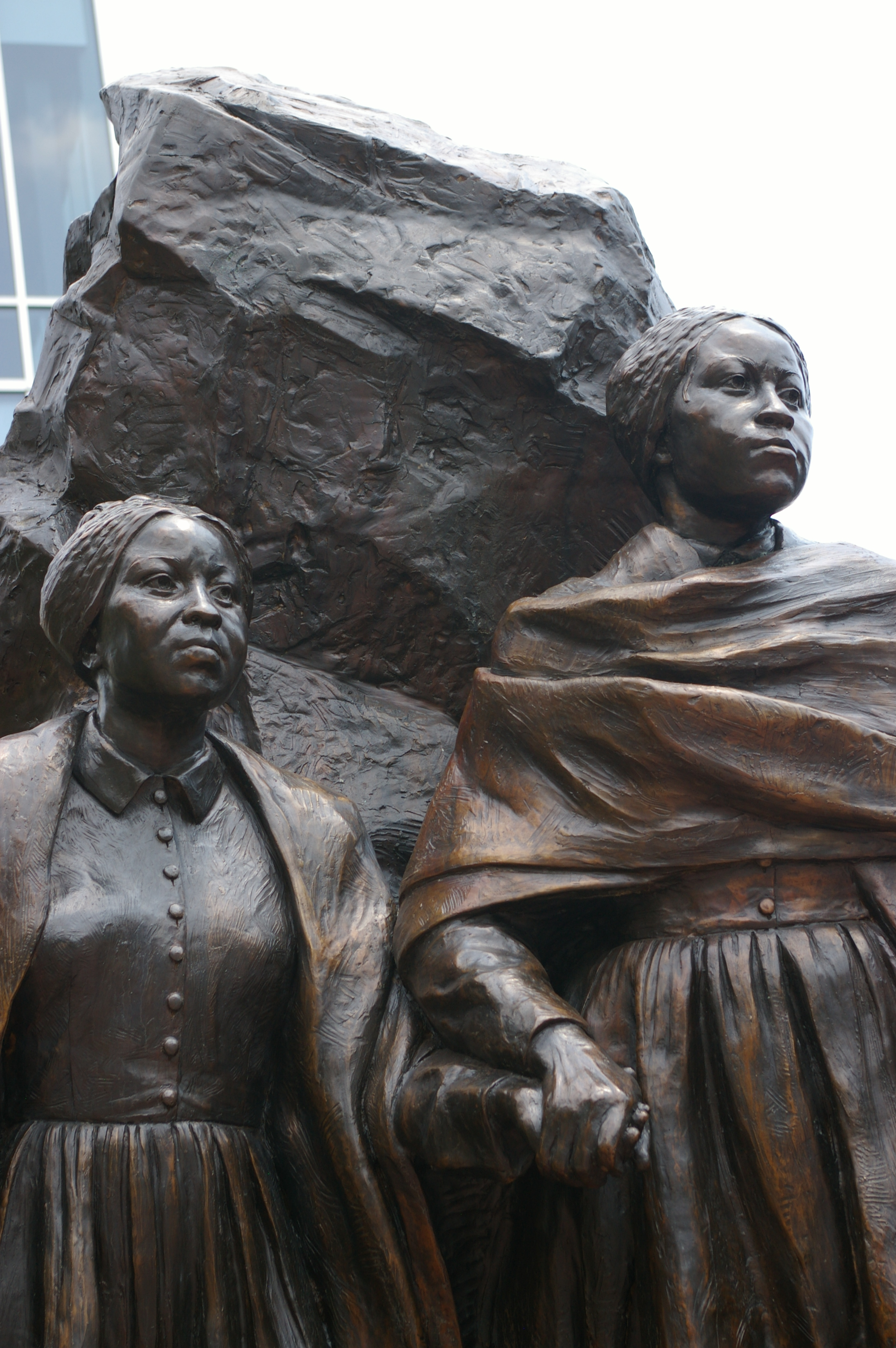
Detail of Edmonson Sisters sculpture (2010) in Alexandria, Virginia

On April 15, 1848, the schooner Pearl docked at a Washington wharf. The Edmonson sisters and four of their brothers joined a large group of enslaved people (a total of 77) in an attempt to escape on the Pearl to freedom in New Jersey. The escape had been planned by two white abolitionists, William L. Chaplin and Gerrit Smith, and two free black men in Washington, including Paul Jennings. Starting as a modest attempt of escape for seven slaves, the effort had been widely communicated and organized within the communities of free black people and enslaved people, changing it to a major and unified effort, without the knowledge of the white organizers or crew. In 1848 free black people outnumbered enslaved people in the District of Columbia by three to one; the community demonstrated it could act in a unified way. Seventy-seven slaves boarded the Pearl, which was to sail down the Potomac River and up the Chesapeake Bay to the Chesapeake and Delaware Canal, from where they would travel up the Delaware River to freedom in New Jersey, a total of 225 miles. At the time, Emily was 13 years old and Mary was 15 or 16.

The Pearl, with the fugitives hidden among boxes, began its way down the Potomac. It was delayed overnight by the shift in tides and then had to wait out rough weather from its anchor down the bay. In Washington the alarm was raised in the morning, as numerous slaveholders found their enslaved people had escaped. Historical accounts conflict and are not clear as to what details were known. Slaveholders put together an armed posse that went downriver on a steamboat. The steamboat caught up with the Pearl at Point Lookout, Maryland, and the posse seized it, towing the ship and its valuable human cargo back to Washington, DC. If the posse had gone north to Baltimore, another likely escape route, the Pearl might have gotten away and reached its destination.

When the Pearl arrived in Washington, a mob awaited the ship. Daniel Drayton and Edward Sayres, the two white captains, had to be taken into safety as pro-slavery people attacked them for threatening their control of property. The fugitive enslaved people were taken to a local jail. It was later reported that when somebody from the crowd asked the Edmonson girls if they were ashamed for what they had done, Emily replied proudly that they would do exactly the same thing again. Three days of riots and disturbances followed, as pro-slavery agitators attacked anti-slavery offices and presses in the city in an attempt to suppress the abolitionist movement. Most of the masters of the fugitive enslaved people decided to sell them quickly to slave traders, rather than provide another chance to escape. Fifty of the enslaved people were transported by train to Baltimore, from where they were sold and transported to the Deep South.

== New Orleans ==
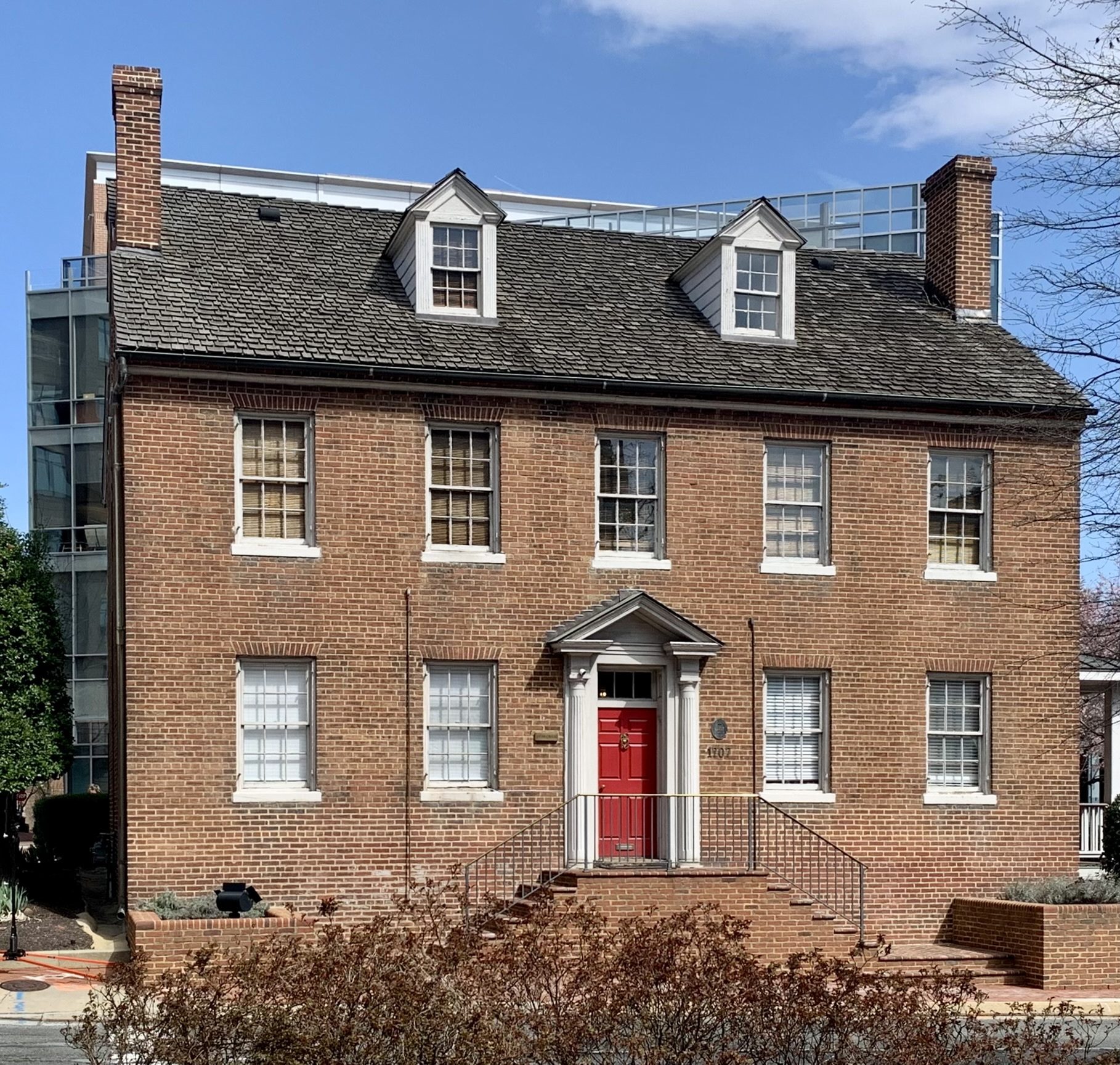
Bruin's Slave Jail in Alexandria, where the sisters were held

Despite Paul Edmonson's desperate efforts to delay the sale of his children so he could raise sufficient money to purchase their freedom, the slave trading partners Bruin & Hill from Alexandria, Virginia, bought the six Edmonson siblings. Under inhumane conditions, the siblings were transported by ship to New Orleans, where they were set at a very high price—$1,200 each. New Orleans was the largest slave market in the nation, and well known for selling "fancy girls" (light-skinned enslaved young women) as sex slaves.

Hamilton Edmonson, the eldest of the siblings, had already been living as a freeman for several years. He worked as a cooper. With the help of donations from a Methodist minister arranged by their father, Hamilton arranged for the purchase of his brother Samuel Edmonson by a prosperous New Orleans cotton merchant to work as his butler. When the merchant died in 1853, Samuel moved with that family and its other slaves to what is now the 1850 House in the Pontalba Buildings on Jackson Square.

In New Orleans, the other siblings were forced to stay for days in an open porch facing the street waiting for buyers. The sisters were handled brusquely and exposed to obscene comments. Before the family could rescue the remainder of its members, a yellow fever epidemic erupted in New Orleans. The slave traders transported the Edmonson sisters back to Alexandria as a measure to protect their investments.

Ephraim Edmonson and John Edmonson, two other brothers who had tried to escape on the Pearl, were kept in New Orleans. Their brother Hamilton worked for and eventually obtained their purchase and freedom.

== Henry Ward Beecher ==
In Alexandria, the Edmonson sisters were hired out to do laundering, ironing and sewing, with wages going to the slave traders. They were locked up at night. Paul Edmonson continued his campaign to free his daughters while Bruin & Hill demanded $2,250 for their release.

With letters from Washington-area supporters, Paul Edmonson met Henry Ward Beecher, a young Congregationalist preacher with a church in Brooklyn, New York who was known to support abolitionism. Beecher's church members raised the funds to purchase the Edmonson sisters and give them freedom. Accompanied by William L. Chaplin, a white abolitionist who had helped pay for the Pearl for the escape attempt, Beecher went to Washington to arrange the transaction.

Mary Edmonson and Emily Edmonson were emancipated on November 4, 1848. The family gathered for a celebration at another sister's house in Washington. Beecher's church continued to contribute money to send the sisters to school for their education. They first enrolled at New York Central College, an interracial institution in Cortland County, New York. They also worked as cleaning servants to support themselves.

While studying, the sisters participated in anti-slavery rallies around New York state. The story of their slavery, escape attempt, and suffering was often repeated. Beecher's son and biographer recorded that "this case at the time attracted wide attention." At the rallies, the Edmonson sisters participated in mock slave auctions designed by Beecher to attract publicity to the abolitionist cause. In describing the role that women such as the Edmonson sisters played in such well-publicized political theater, a scholar at the University of Maryland asserted in 2002:

Beecher staged his most successful auctions using attractive mulatto women or female children (such as the Edmonson sisters, or the beautiful little girl, Pinky, who, according to Beecher, "No one would know from a white child"), making a material choice in "casting" his political protest that was calculated to arouse the audience's interest. As he displayed the women's bodies on the stage, Beecher exhorted his audience to imagine the fate that awaited these young women, or "marketable commodities", as he termed them, in the fancy girl auctions of New Orleans. His casting choices could only work with beautiful, fair-skinned women.

== Fugitive Slave Convention ==
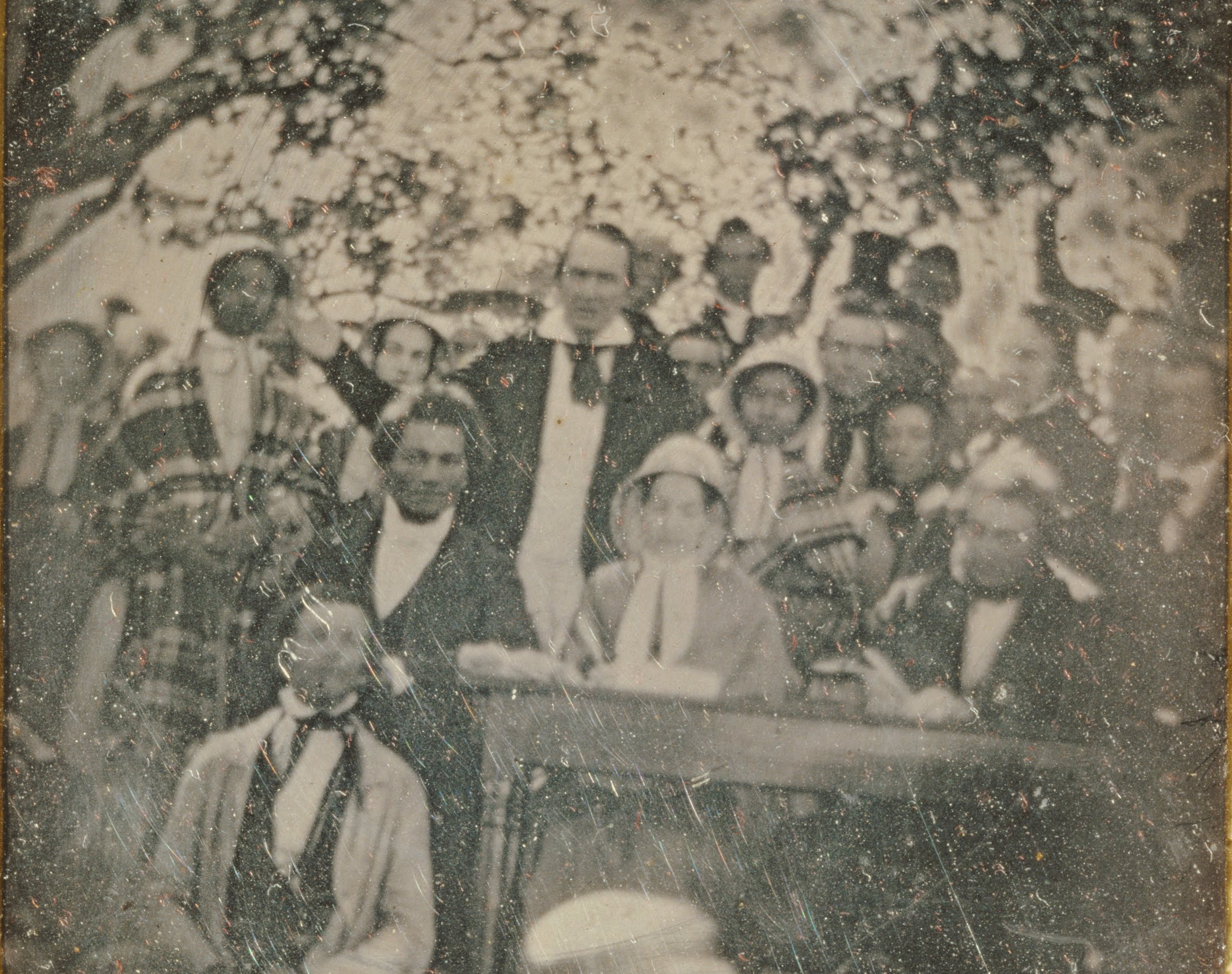
Daguerreotype taken by Ezra Greenleaf Weld at the 1850 Fugitive Slave Convention, Cazenovia, New York. The Edmonson sisters are standing wearing bonnets and shawls in the row behind the seated speakers. Frederick Douglass is seated, with Gerritt Smith standing behind him.

In summer 1850, the Edmonson sisters attended the Fugitive Slave Convention, an anti-slavery meeting in Cazenovia, New York, organized by local abolitionist Theodore Dwight Weld and others, to demonstrate against the Fugitive Slave Act, soon to be passed by the U.S. Congress. Under this act, slave owners had powers to arrest fugitive slaves in the North. The convention declared all slaves to be prisoners of war and warned the nation of an unavoidable insurrection of slaves unless they were emancipated.

At this convention, the sisters were included in a historic daguerreotype photograph taken by Theodore Dwight Weld's brother, Ezra Greenleaf Weld. Also included in the picture is the legendary orator Frederick Douglass.

While there were many slaves "whom it was impossible to tell from a white", the Edmonson sisters' mixed-race appearance may have well suited their role as two of the "public faces" of American slavery.

== Oberlin College ==
In 1853, the Edmonson sisters attended the Young Ladies Preparatory School at Oberlin College in Ohio through the support of Beecher and his sister, Harriet Beecher Stowe, author of Uncle Tom's Cabin. Since shortly after its founding in the 1830s, the school had admitted blacks as well as whites, and was a center of abolitionist activism. Six months after arriving at Oberlin, Mary Edmonson died of tuberculosis.

That same year, Stowe included part of the Edmonson sisters' history with other factual accounts of slavery experiences in A Key to Uncle Tom's Cabin.

== Normal School for Colored Girls ==
Eighteen-year-old Emily returned to Washington with her father, where she enrolled in the Normal School for Colored Girls (now known as University of the District of Columbia). Located near the current Dupont Circle, the school trained young African-American women to become teachers. For protection, the Edmonson family moved to a cabin on the grounds. Emily and Myrtilla Miner, the founder of the school, learned to shoot. Emily taught for black women and continued her abolitionist work.

== Later life ==
At age 25 in 1860, Emily Edmonson married Larkin Johnson. They returned to the Sandy Spring, Maryland, area and lived there for twelve years before moving to Anacostia in Washington, DC. There they purchased land and became founding members of the Hillsdale community. At least one of their children was born in Montgomery County before their move to Anacostia. Edmonson maintained her relationship with fellow Anacostia resident Frederick Douglass, and both continued working in the abolitionist movement. Even after the ratification of the 13th Amendment, they remained so close that Emily's granddaughters observed that they were like "brother and sister". Emily Edmonson Johnson died at her home on September 15, 1895.

== Legacy and honors ==
- 2010, the city of Alexandria, Virginia, named a park on Duke Street as Edmonson Plaza after the two sisters. It is near a former slave trader's facility and other historical sites associated with slavery.
- 2010, a 10-foot-tall (3.0 m) bronze sculpture of the two sisters by the sculptor Erik Blome was installed at Edmonson Plaza at 1701 Duke Street in Alexandria, next to the site that was Bruin & Hill's slave-holding facility (now a private office).

== Other representation ==
- 1992, Judlyne A. Lilly's play The Pearl, which drew on the writings of John H. Paynter (a descendant of one of the Pearl fugitives), was given its première by The Source Theatre in Washington, D.C.

== See also ==
- Fugitive slave laws
- List of slaves
- Fancy girls
