= Pearl incident =

1848 slave escape attempt

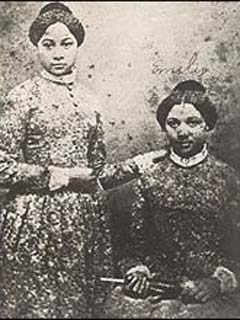
This daguerreotype photograph shows Mary Edmonson (standing) and Emily Edmonson (seated), shortly after they were freed in 1848.

The Pearl incident was the largest recorded nonviolent escape attempt by enslaved people in United States history. On April 15, 1848, seventy-seven slaves attempted to escape Washington, D.C. by sailing away on a schooner called The Pearl. Their plan was to sail south on the Potomac River, then north up the Chesapeake Bay and Delaware River to the free state of New Jersey, a distance of nearly 225 miles (362 km). The attempt was organized by both abolitionist whites and free blacks, who expanded the plan to include many more enslaved people. Paul Jennings, a former slave who had served President James Madison, helped plan the escape.

The escapees, including men, women, and children, found their passage delayed by winds running against the ship. Two days later, they were captured on the Chesapeake Bay near Point Lookout, Maryland, by an armed posse traveling by steamboat. As punishment, the owners sold most of the escapees to traders, who took them to the Deep South. Freedom for the two Edmonson sisters was purchased that year with funds raised by Henry Ward Beecher's Plymouth Congregational Church in Brooklyn, New York.

When the ship and its captives were brought back to Washington, a pro-slavery riot broke out in the city. The mob attempted to attack an abolitionist newspaper and other known anti-slavery activists. Extra police patrolled for three days to try to contain the violence until the unrest ended. The episode provoked a slavery debate in Congress, and may have influenced a provision in the Compromise of 1850 that ended the slave trade in the District of Columbia, although not slavery itself. The escape inspired Harriet Beecher Stowe in writing her novel Uncle Tom's Cabin (1852), in which people in slavery dreaded being "sold South", and increased support for abolitionism in the North.

Three white men were initially charged on numerous counts with aiding the escape and transporting the captives; the captains Daniel Drayton and Edward Sayres were tried and convicted in 1848. After serving four years in prison, they were pardoned by President Millard Fillmore in 1852.

== Background ==
Like the surrounding states of Maryland and Virginia and others in the South, Washington, D.C., was a "slave society" as defined by the historian Ira Berlin in his Many Thousands Gone: A History of Two Centuries of American Slavery. It supported a major slave market and was a center of the domestic slave trade; with its connection to the Chesapeake Bay by the Potomac River, Washington was an important transit point for captives being shipped or marched overland from the Upper South to markets or owners in the Deep South. Numerous families in the city actively enslaved people, generally forcing them to act as domestic servants and artisans. Some hired out their slaves to work as servants on the waterfront and in other urban jobs.

In 1848, free blacks outnumbered slaves in the District of Columbia by three to one. Abolitionists, both free blacks and whites, were active in the city in trying to end the slave trade and slavery. In addition, since the 1840s, there had been an organized group that supported the Underground Railroad in the district. The abolitionist community demonstrated in its planning for the escape that it could act in a unified way. They sought to plan an event that would capture the attention of Congress and the country to promote an end to slavery in the District of Columbia. White supporters included the abolitionists William L. Chaplin and Gerrit Smith of New York, who helped find the captain Daniel Drayton and pay for a ship. The black community made the project its own, notifying so many families that soon there were 77 slaves who wanted to be part of the escape.

For two days prior to the slaves' escape, many city residents had been celebrating the news from France of the expulsion of King Louis Philippe and the founding of the French Second Republic, with its assertion of universal human rights and liberty. Some free blacks and slaves were inspired by plans to gain similar freedoms for American slaves. People gathered to hear addresses in Lafayette Square in front of the White House. As the historian John H. Paynter recounted:

Among the addresses which aroused the large crowd to enthusiasm were those of Senator Patterson of Tennessee (Note: Despite Paynter's recollection, Patterson was not elected as senator until 1866; in 1848 he was still an attorney in Greeneville, Tennessee.) and Senator Foote of Mississippi. The former likened the Tree of Liberty to the great cotton-wood tree of his section, whose seed is blown far and wide, while the latter spoke eloquently of the universal emancipation of man and the approaching recognition in all countries of the great principles of equality and brotherhood."

In April 1848, Washington Navy Yard blacksmith and former slave Daniel Bell, helped plan one of the largest and most daring slave escapes of the era. Daniel Bell was fearful that with the death of slaveholder Robert Armistead, his wife Mary and their children were to be sold. The Bell family had made numerous unsuccessful attempts to use the courts of the District of Columbia to secure their freedom. Ultimately Daniel's wife Mary, eight of the Bell's children, and two grandchildren would hazard the perilous journey on the schooner Pearl. Paul Jennings, a former slave of President James Madison, was among the free black organizers of the escape.

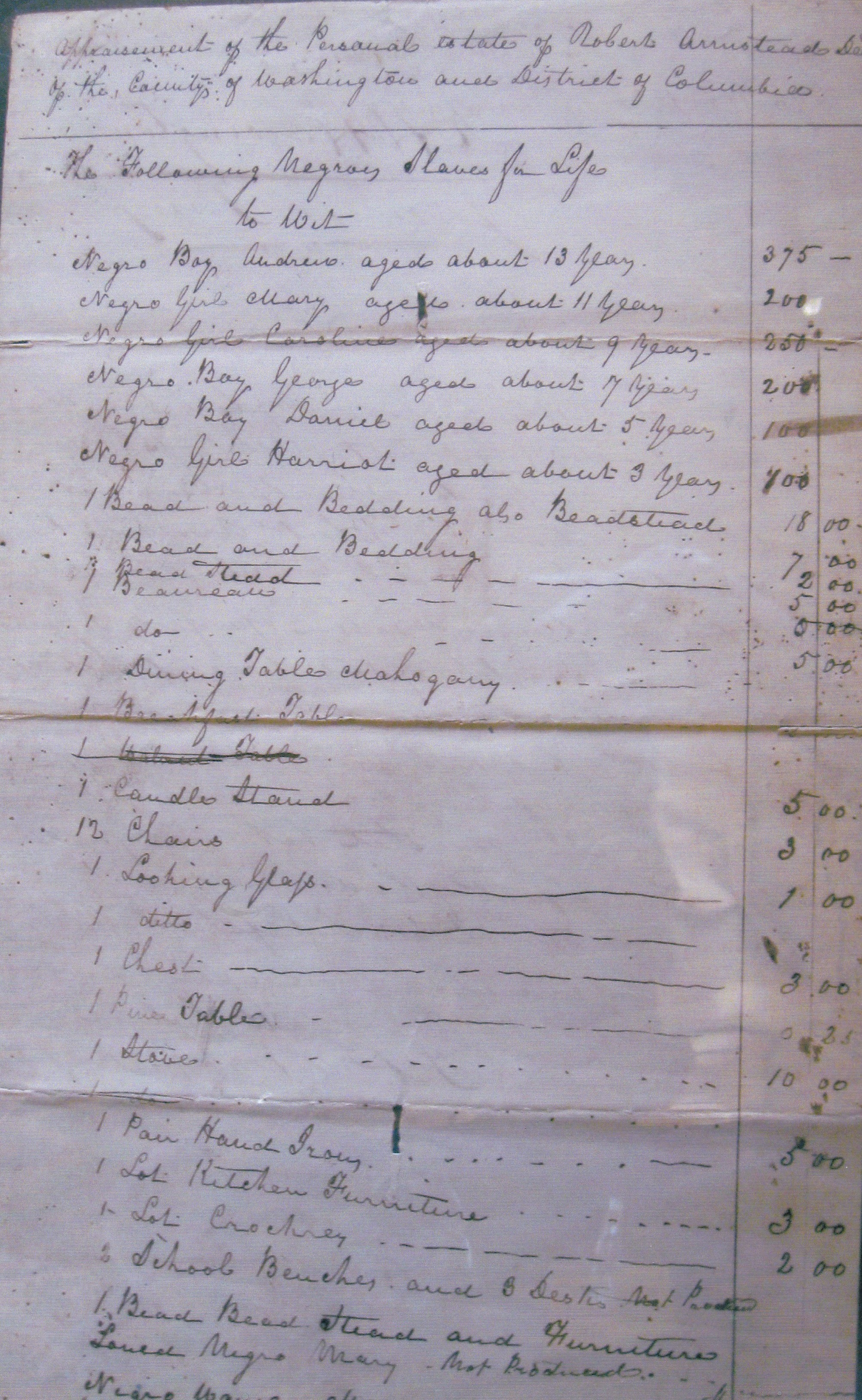
1832 appraisal of the estate of Robert Armistead listing the enslaved children of Daniel and Mary Bell and their appraised valuation. Mary Bell is mentioned at the bottom of the document. NARA RG21

Among the slaves planning to leave were six grown siblings of the Paul and Amelia Edmonson family; because Amelia was a slave, their fourteen children had been born into slavery. Paul Edmonson was a free black. The two sisters and four brothers had all been "hired out" by their master to work for pay in the city. A variety of other families also hoped to escape. The Potomac River and Chesapeake Bay provided a water route to the free states of New Jersey and Pennsylvania, but the organizers had to acquire a ship to transport the slaves over the 225 miles of water. Jennings confessed his role in organizing the escape in a letter to his mentor, the northern senator Daniel Webster, an abolitionist. Jennings escaped public notice at the time for his role.

The captain found to pilot the ship, Daniel Drayton, was from Philadelphia and supported abolition, but admitted that he was offered money to transport the slaves. He found a ship and willing partner in Edward Sayres, the pilot of the 54-ton schooner The Pearl. His only other crew was Chester English, a cook. "In the darkness of the night seventy-seven colored men, women, and children found their way to the schooner." (Note: Ricks' 2007 book and other sources state the number of slaves as seventy-seven.) With Drayton and Sayres accepting the risk of transporting them, on Saturday night, April 15, the slaves boarded the ship. Chester English, the cook, was on The Pearl to supply the passengers until they reached freedom.

== Escape plan and capture ==
The organizers intended for the ship to sail 100 miles (160 km) down the Potomac River, then 125 miles (201 km) north up the Chesapeake Bay to freedom in New Jersey, a free state. But the wind was against the schooner, so the ship had to anchor for the night. The next morning, numerous slaveowners realized their slaves were missing and sent out an armed posse of 35 men aboard one slaveowner's steamboat, The Salem.

Drayton described the capture of The Pearl in his later memoir:

A Mr. Dodge, of Georgetown, a wealthy old gentleman, originally from New England, missed three or four slaves from his family, and a small steamboat, of which he was the proprietor, was readily obtained. Thirty-five men, including a son or two of old Dodge, and several of those whose slaves were missing, volunteered to man her; and they set out about Sunday noon.

The party on The Salem found The Pearl on Monday morning near Point Lookout in Maryland, upon which they immediately took the slaves and ship back to Washington.

=== Betrayal ===
In 1916, the author John H. Paynter identified Judson Diggs as the slave who had betrayed the fugitives. Diggs drove a participant to the dock and accepted the destitute fugitive's promise of future payment. However, Diggs then reported the suspicious activity. Paynter, a descendant of the Edmonson siblings, interviewed descendants of the escapees. He wrote: "Judson Diggs, one of their own people, a man who in all reason might have been expected to sympathize with their effort, took upon himself the role of Judas."

== Riots ==
Supporters of slavery were outraged by the attempted escape, and an angry mob formed. For three days, crowds were riled in the Washington Riot, and numerous police were called in to protect one of their targets. They fixed on Gamaliel Bailey, the publisher of the anti-slavery newspaper New Era. (Note: The abolitionist Frederick Douglass later took over the paper and renamed it New National Era.) Suspecting him because of his record of abolitionist publishing, a mob of slave owners almost destroyed the newspaper building but were held off by the police.

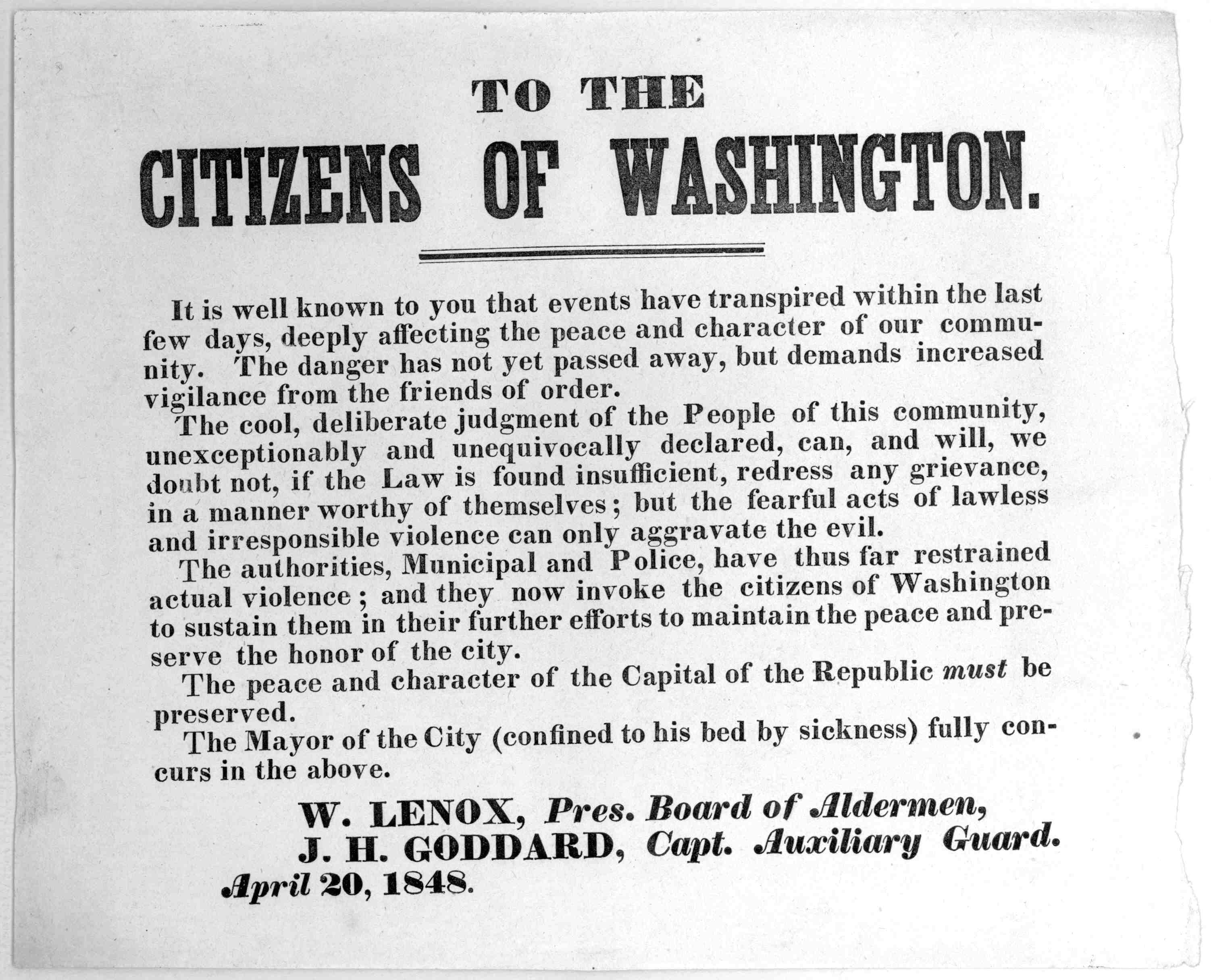
This 1848 poster was made by the District of Columbia government to warn alarmed white citizens fearing a slave revolt, not to riot or commit acts of violence. The poster was in response to public concern and rumors of a slave uprising, following the capture of the schooner Pearl

Once the mob dissipated, the slave owners debated how to punish their slaves. They sold all seventy-seven slaves to slave traders from Georgia and Louisiana, who would take them to the Deep South and the New Orleans slave market. There they would likely be sold to work on the large sugar and cotton plantations, which held two-thirds of the slaves in the South by the time of the Civil War. Congressman John I. Slingerland, an abolitionist from New York, alerted anti-slavery activists to the actions of the slave owners and slave traders, which helped increase the effort to end the slave trade in the nation's capital. Friends and families scrambled to try to locate their loved ones and buy them from the traders before they were taken south. The case of the two young Edmonson sisters in particular attracted national attention. At least 50 of the recaptured slaves were sold to trader Hope H. Slatter who put them in Bernard M. Campbell's Baltimore slave pen and then shipped south from there.

Illinois Congressman John Wentworth of Illinois told a story about the Pearl incident in his 1882 memoirs:

One morning, I missed my boots, and when I went for the bootblack, he was missing also. After a few days, I saw a procession of captured slaves, who had sought their liberty in a Potomac schooner, chained two-and-two, conducted toward the slave-pen; and there I noticed my bootblack trudging along in my boots. I had made a successful canvass for Congress in those boots, but they failed the slave in his canvass for freedom. He was sold for the Southern market, as was customary with captured fugitives, and my boots went with him. But whether they were worn out by him upon some sugar, rice, or cotton plantation, or by his new master, it was useless for me to inquire. I was a Democrat in those days. An anti-slavery friend, who stood by me at the time, observed that the slave ought to have known that if he ever got into Democratic boots he would have to go South, whereas, if he had only stolen his boots instead of mine, they would have landed him safely in Canada.

(The only member of the Illinois delegation to the 30th Congress of 1847–48 who was not a member of the Democratic Party was one-term U.S. Representative Abraham Lincoln, a Whig.)

== Trial ==
Drayton, Sayres, and English were initially indicted; the educator Horace Mann, who had helped the slaves from the La Amistad mutiny in 1839, was hired as their main lawyer. The following July, both Drayton and Sayres were charged with 77 counts each of aiding a slave escape and illegally transporting a slave. English was released because his role was minor and indirect.

After appeals were filed and charges were reduced, a jury convicted both Drayton and Sayres. They were sentenced to jail because neither could pay the fines associated with the convictions and the court costs, amounting to $10,000. After they had been imprisoned for four years, Senator Charles Sumner, an abolitionist, petitioned President Millard Fillmore for pardons for the men. The President pardoned them in 1852.

== Aftermath ==
In response to the escape attempt and the riot, Congress ended the slave trade in the District of Columbia, although it did not abolish slavery. Prohibiting the slave trade was a provision of the Compromise of 1850, which dealt primarily with the issue of whether new states in the West would be admitted to the Union as slave states or as free states. Daniel Bell although an organizer was not on the Pearl at the time of its capture. While he may have been interrogated, he was fortunate in one respect as he was never charged with aiding or abetting the plot and was able to keep his job at the navy yard, although his wage was reduced from $1.20 per day to $1.12 per day.

The failed attempt provoked reactions from abolitionists and pro-slavery activists across the country and contributed to the divisive rhetoric that ultimately led to the American Civil War. It also inspired Harriet Beecher Stowe in her writing of Uncle Tom's Cabin, an immediately popular anti-slavery novel published in 1852.

In 2017, a street in The Wharf development in Washington, D.C.'s Southwest Waterfront neighborhood was named "Pearl Street" in commemoration of the incident.

== See also ==
- Robert Smalls, who led a group of escapees through a blockade using the USS Planter in 1863
- Hope H. Slatter – American slave trader (1790–1853)
