= John Todd (author) =

American minister and author

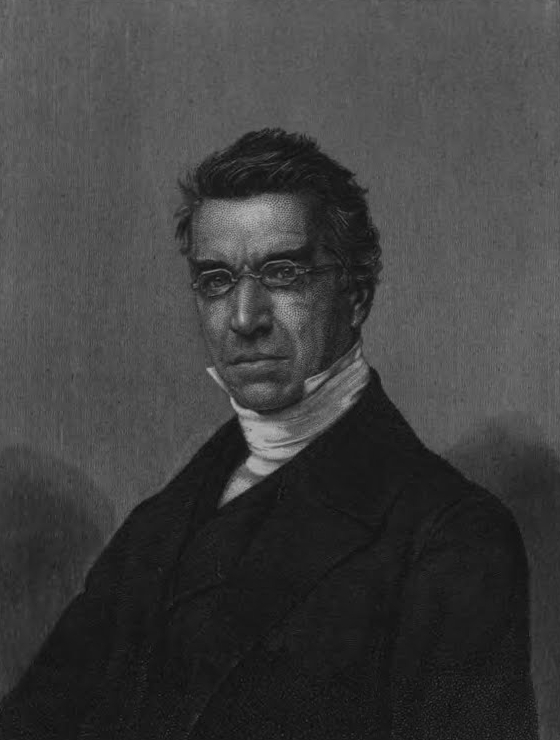
John Todd

John Todd (October 9, 1800 – August 24, 1873) was an American minister and author of over thirty books, including the popular work of moralistic advice, The Student's Manual (1835).

Todd, youngest child of Dr. Timothy and Phebe (Buel) Todd, was born in Rutland, Vt., October 9, 1800. In his childhood, his father died, and it was only by his own exertions that he was able to secure a liberal education. He graduated from Yale College in 1822. From college he went to Andover Seminary, where he completed the three years' course, and afterwards remained for nearly a year engaged in advanced study. On the 3rd of Jan. 1827, he was ordained first pastor of the Union Church in Groton, Mass., and in the following March was married to Mary S., daughter of Rev. Joab Brace, of Newington, Conn. He resigned his charge at Groton, Jan. 8, 1833, and on the 30th of the same month was installed over the Edwards Church, Northampton, Mass. Here he remained until Nov. 4, 1836, when he removed to Philadelphia, where he was installed pastor of the First Congregational Church, on the 17th of the same month. This position he resigned in Nov, 1841, and soon after removed to Pittsfield, Mass., where he took charge of the First Congregational Church, Jan. 1, 1842, and was installed, February 22. In 1870, he proposed to the church to lay down the active duties of pastor, but at their request, his resignation was deferred, until in March, 1872, impaired health enforced his retirement.

Todd originated the charity for Pittsfield's House of Mercy cottage hospital. He died in Pittsfield, after an illness of three months August 24, 1873, in his 73d year. His widow survived him, with five of their nine children, one of whom graduated Yale in 1855. In 1845 Mr. Todd received the degree of D.D. from Williams College, and was elected one of the trustees of that institution, which office he held until 1872. Dr. Todd was remarkably successful as a pastor, and also wielded a powerful influence as an author. He published over thirty volumes, besides many sermons and pamphlets. His most widely known book, "The Student's Manual," was first published in 1835.

The Reverend Doctor was also notable for having taken part of the Golden Spike Ceremony at Promontory Point, Utah on May 10, 1869. During the event, Dr. Todd gave a prayer that was broadcast throughout the nation.
