= Glen Haven, New York =

Hamlet in New York, United States

Coordinates: 42°45′58.1″N 76°16′4.6″W

Near the southern end (the head end) of Skaneateles Lake, the hamlet of Glen Haven is situated in a splendidly scenic valley in the Town of Scott, Cortland County and the Town of Niles, Cayuga County. Nearby Spafford Landing is in the Town of Spafford, Onondaga County. The portion of the community on the eastern shore is known as "Fair Haven," to distinguish it from the western shore portion, known as "Glen Haven." The community provides marina and docking facilities, uncommon on the lake, together with dining and lodging accommodations. Glen Haven has a historic library building, recalling earlier days when a large resort hotel attracted visitors arriving by steamboat.

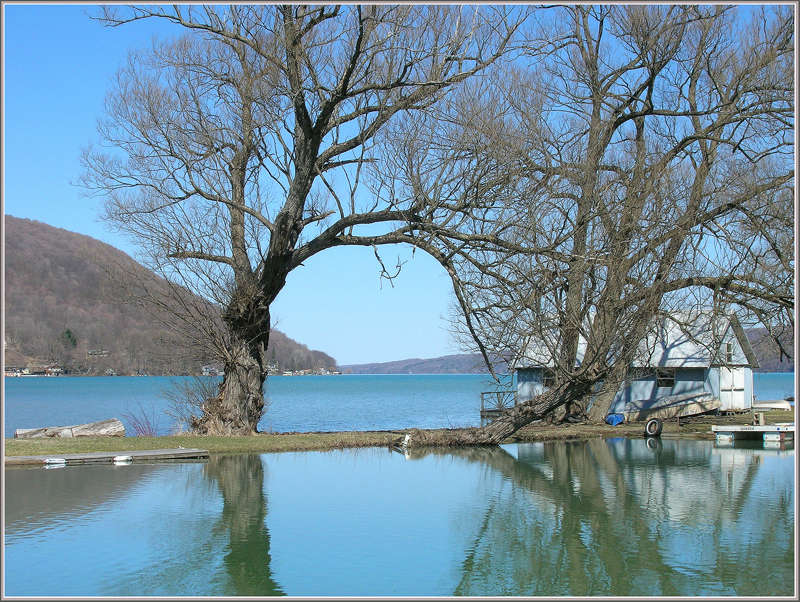
Skaneateles Lake at Glen Haven.
