= List of recipients of aid from Gerrit Smith =

Gerrit Smith (March 6, 1797 – December 28, 1874), was an American social reformer, abolitionist, businessman, public intellectual, and philanthropist. He provided aid to a variety of people and organizations.

== People ==
- William G. Allen (c. 1820 – 1 May 1888)
- John Brown (abolitionist) (May 9, 1800 – December 2, 1859)
- Jefferson Davis (June 3, 1808 December 6, 1889)
- Frederick Douglass (c. February 1817 or February 1818 – February 20, 1895)
- The Secret Six, who funded John Brown's raid on Harpers Ferry
- Lysander Spooner (January 19, 1808 — May 14, 1887)

== Organizations ==
- American Colonization Society
- New England Emigrant Aid Company
- New York Central College
- The North Star (anti-slavery newspaper)
- Oneida Institute
- Oswego City Library
- Pearl incident
- Timbuctoo, New York

== Events ==
- John Brown's raid on Harpers Ferry (October 16–18, 1859)
