= 1858 New York gubernatorial election =

- November 2, 1858
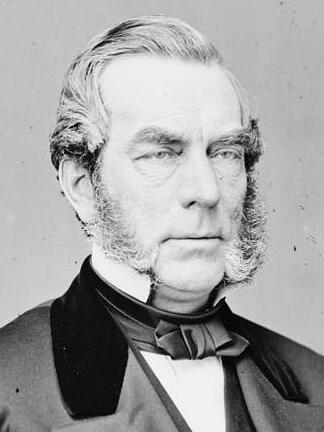

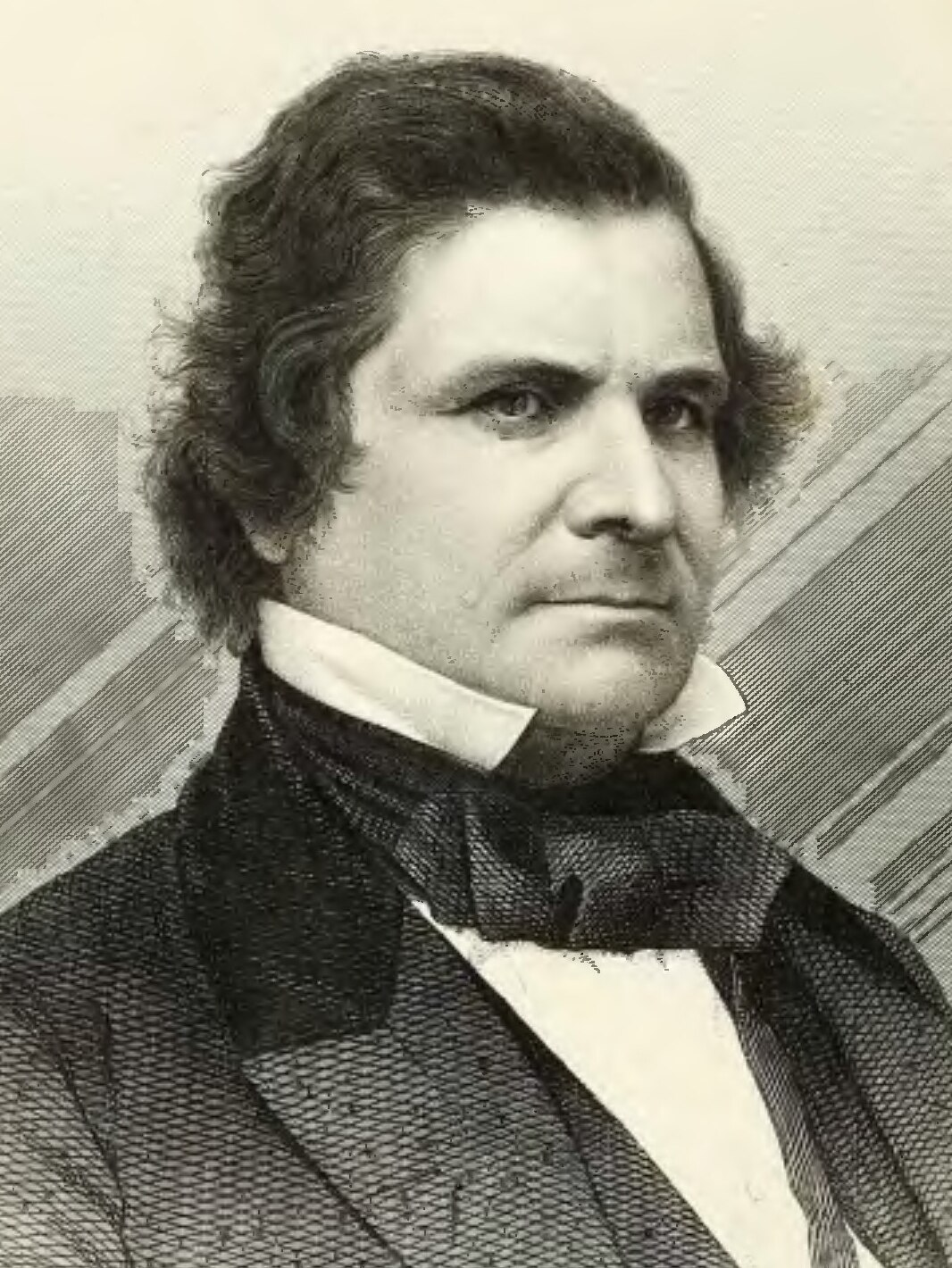

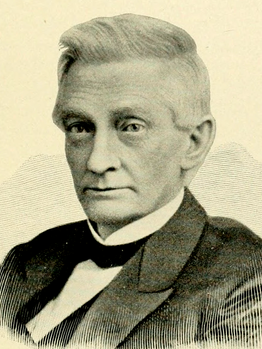
Nominee	Edwin D. Morgan	Amasa J. Parker	Lorenzo Burrows
Party	Republican	Democratic	Know Nothing
Popular vote	247,953	230,513	61,137
Percentage	45.49%	42.29%	11.22%
- Results by county Morgan: 30–40% 40–50% 50–60% 60–70% 70–80% Parker: 30–40% 40–50% 50–60% 60–70% 70–80%
Governor before election
John Alsop King
Republican
Elected Governor
Edwin D. Morgan
Republican

The 1858 New York gubernatorial election was held on November 2, 1858. Incumbent Governor John A. King did not run for re-election to a second term in office. In the race to succeed him, Edwin D. Morgan defeated Amasa J. Parker and Lorenzo Burrows.

== Radical Abolitionist and Temperance nominations ==
A mass convention to nominate Gerrit Smith for Governor met on August 4 at Syracuse, New York. It was the first nominating convention of the campaign season, bringing together members of the anti-slavery and temperance movement in the state. Frederick Douglass, William Goodell and Max Langenschwartz of Germany were featured speakers, and the convention was open to women.

The convention adopted a platform denouncing slavery as "a crime against God and man of such matchless magnitude that no forms of law can change its infernal character." Despite the stated purpose of the event, Republicans attempted to interrupt the proceedings to oppose Smith's nomination, and Frederick Douglass spoke at length against the nomination of Smith without a vote or debate, but Smith was ultimately nominated without explicit opposition.

== Republican nomination ==
=== Candidates ===
- James M. Cook, former New York Treasurer, New York Comptroller and State Senator from Ballston Spa
- Alexander S. Diven, State Senator from Elmira
- Horace Greeley, editor of the New York Tribune and former U.S. Representative from New York City
- Timothy Jenkins, former U.S. Representative from Oneida Castle
- Edwin D. Morgan, businessman, chairman of the Republican National Committee and former State Senator from New York City
- George Washington Patterson, chairman of the New York Harbor Commission and former Lieutenant Governor

==== Declined to be drafted ====
- John A. King, incumbent Governor since 1857

=== Results ===
The Republican and American Party state conventions both met on September 8 at Syracuse, New York. At the Republican convention, there was some debate about the nomination of a joint ticket with the American Party. A motion to nominate candidates for governor was voted down by 166 to 67, and the convention adjourned. The American convention, after much debate, adjourned too.

The Republican convention re-assembled on September 9, and balloting was taken for governor. Edwin D. Morgan led on the first balllot by a large margin, receiving the first vote ever cast by Thurlow Weed at a state convention. Before the second ballot could be taken, a delegation from the American convention arrived. morgan received a large majority on the second ballot, and the Americans returned to their convention with a delegation of Republicans, who offered to nominate Americans for Canal Commissioner and Prison Inspector, forming a joint ticket. However, the Americans decided against their proposal, nominating Lorenzo Burrows by acclamation.

1858 Republican convention, first ballot
Party	Candidate	Votes	%
Republican	Edwin D. Morgan	116	45.85%
Republican	Timothy Jenkins	51	20.16%
Republican	James M. Cook	35	13.83%
Republican	George W. Patterson	23	9.09%
Republican	Alexander S. Diven	21	8.30%
Republican	John A. King (draft effort)	4	1.58%
Republican	Horace Greeley	3	1.19%
Total votes		253	100.00%

1858 Republican convention, second ballot
Party	Candidate	Votes	%
Republican	Edwin D. Morgan	165	64.71%
Republican	Timothy Jenkins	52	20.39%
Republican	George W. Patterson	20	7.84%
Republican	Alexander S. Diven	18	7.06%
Total votes		255	100.00%

== General election ==
=== Candidates ===
- Lorenzo Burrows, former New York Comptroller (American)
- Edwin D. Morgan, businessman, chairman of the Republican National Committee and former State Senator from New York City (Republican)
- Amasa J. Parker, former Justice of the New York Supreme Court, former U.S. Representative from Delhi and nominee in 1856 (Democratic)
- Gerrit Smith, former U.S. Representative from Peterboro and nominee in 1856 (Radical Abolitionist and Temperance)

=== Results ===
1858 New York gubernatorial election
Party	Candidate	Votes	%	±%
Republican	Edwin D. Morgan	247,953	45.51%	▲0.99
Democratic	Amasa J. Parker	230,513	42.31%	▲8.87
Know Nothing	Lorenzo Burrows	60,880	11.17%	▼10.87
Radical Abolitionist	Gerrit Smith	5,470	1.00%	▲1.00
Total votes		544,816	100.00%	

== See also ==
- New York gubernatorial elections
- 1858 United States elections
