= Greene Smith =

American ornithologist

- Born: 1842; Peterboro, New York
- Died: 1886 (aged 44)
- Education: Harvard University
- Parent(s): Gerrit Smith; Ann Carroll Fitzhugh
- Scientific career
- Fields: Ornithology
- Workplaces: Cornell University
- Patrons: Angelina Grimke and Theodore Weld

Greene Smith (1842–1886) was an American amateur scientist and taxidermist with a specific interest in ornithology. His father was Gerrit Smith.

== Personal life ==
Greene Smith was born in 1842. He was the son of Gerrit Smith. He started bird watching when he was nine.

As a child he was educated by Angelina Grimke and Theodore Weld. Smith moved to Cambridge, Massachusetts, to attend Harvard. After two years he was sent back to his hometown of Peterboro, New York, due to his smoking and drinking habits.

He served in the Union Army from 1864 to 1865. In 1875, he was the president of the National Sportsmen's Association. He 1877 he was president of the New York State Association for Conservation of Fish and Game.

His wife was Elizabeth "Bessie" Smith. Smith died of tuberculosis in 1886.

== Ornithology and the Bird House ==
Smith was a professor of ornithology at Cornell University. He built a museum in 1863, the Greene Smith Museum, which was three stories and housed his collection of bird specimens. The house is also nicknamed the Bird House. It was located in Peterboro, New York. The bird house had central heating, a rarity at that time for homes. The plumbing was made of marble, the paneling was birch and the windows were stained glass. It also had a staircase made of mahogany. He donated 362 bird specimens to Cornell in 1869. He did taxidermy work for the Smithsonian Institution. He was friends with Spencer Baird and J.G. Bell. Smith died in 1886 while trying to compile an annotated catalog for his taxidermy bird collection.

== Legacy ==
The majority of the birds, eggs, and nests in his museum collection—over 2,000 specimens—went to Harvard, Colgate University, or Cornell University. At the time of his death, his collection of hummingbird specimens were estimated to be worth $75,000. The collection was originally offered to the New York City Parks Department but was rejected due to what was described as by The Ornithologist at the time as "their ignorance of its value". His papers are held in the collection of Syracuse University Library. The house collapsed around 1975. The former ruins of the museum are located on the grounds of the Gerrit Smith Estate. The Greene Smith Society was founded in his memory. The Society focuses on citizen scientists in the United States.
