= Elizabeth Smith Miller =

American women's rights activist (1822–1911)

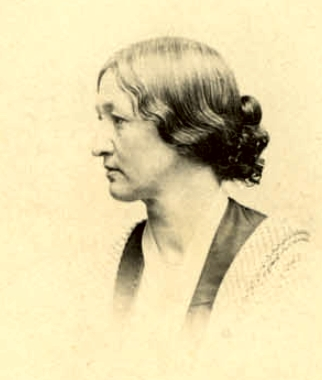
- Born: Elizabeth Smith; September 20, 1822; Peterboro, New York, U.S.
- Died: May 23, 1911 (aged 88); Geneva, New York, U.S.
- Occupations: Advocate and philanthropist
- Spouse: Charles Dudley Miller (m. 1843; died 1896)
- Children: 4
- Parent(s): Gerrit Smith; Ann Carroll Fitzhugh

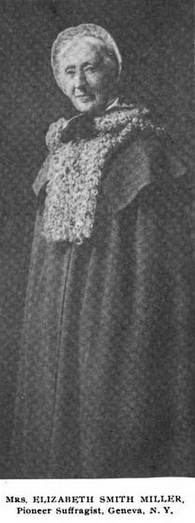
Elizabeth Smith Miller, from a 1908 publication

Elizabeth Smith Miller (née Smith; September 20, 1822 – May 23, 1911), known as "Libby", was an American advocate and financial supporter of the women's rights movement.

== Biography ==
Elizabeth Smith was born September 20, 1822, in Peterboro, New York. She was the daughter of antislavery philanthropist Gerrit Smith and his spouse, the abolitionist Ann Carroll Fitzhugh. She studied at the Young Ladies' Domestic Seminary in Clinton, New York (1835–1836), then at a Quaker school in Philadelphia (1839–1840). While she was not much interested in politics, she met a continuing stream of abolitionists, temperance advocates, and other radicals, including John Brown, who visited her father.

In 1843, Elizabeth married Charles Dudley Miller; Beriah Green performed the ceremony. Charles was at one point a bank manager in nearby Cazenovia, where the couple lived for the first 2 1/2 years of their marriage. They then lived in Gerrit Smith's mansion from 1846 to 1850. Elizabeth and Charles both worked for a stretch in Gerrit Smith's land office in Peterboro. However, neither Elizabeth nor Charles had a regular career with income from work; Gerrit provided them with an annual income of $8,000 (equivalent to $258,000 in 2025). After a period in Washington, D.C., they occupied for 18 years the "Cottage Across the Brook", on her father's estate at Peterboro, New York. It was later the home of their son, Gerrit Smith Miller. The family later moved to Geneva, New York, where Charles died in 1896 and Elizabeth on May 23, 1911, aged 88. Her estate was worth $782,667 (equivalent to $27,043,940 in 2025).

== National Women's Right Convention ==
At the third National Women's Rights Convention gavelled in Syracuse (1852), Elizabeth was the author of a motion to create state-based women's rights organizations when the motion to create a national organization failed. She was with Elizabeth Cady Stanton and Susan B. Anthony in the founding of the National Woman Suffrage Association.

== Literary activity ==
Following her father's death in 1874, Elizabeth Smith Miller, along with author Octavius Brooks Frothingham, worked on a biography of his life. When Frothingham went so far as to allege that Smith had prior knowledge of John Brown's raid on Harper's Ferry, Elizabeth ordered the publisher to recall the tomes, break their bindings, and remove the information. In her later years, she penned a home economics treatise.

== Dress reform ==
An advocate of Victorian dress reform, Elizabeth Smith Miller received intense publicity and criticism for wearing the Turkish pantaloons and knee-length skirt later popularized by Amelia Bloomer in The Lily, and known as “bloomers.” The apparel and its undergarment was similar to utilitarian outfits also worn by women of the utopian Oneida Community and the Oneida Nation of Native Americans.

Dress reform was seen as essential in liberating women from the functional constraints imposed on their activities by conventions reinforcing a male-dominated society. "Bloomers" were worn by leaders of the women's rights movement as an act of rebellion, until the amount of attention the protest received in the popular press became a distraction from the movement.

== Publications ==
- In the Kitchen, Boston: Lee and Shepard, 1875. 592 pp. Full text available at the Library of Congress Archive.org Google Books Contains 1,300 recipes in 27 categories.

== Archival material ==
In the National American Woman Suffrage Association Collection at the Library of Congress there are seven volumes of scrapbooks kept by Elizabeth and her daughter Anne Fitzhugh Miller. They have been digitized and are available online.
