= Ann Carroll Fitzhugh =

American abolitionist (1805–1875)

Ann Carroll Smith (née Fitzhugh; 1805–1875) was an American abolitionist, mother of Elizabeth Smith Miller, and the spouse of Gerrit Smith. Her older brother was Henry Fitzhugh.

Ann and Gerrit Smith's Peterboro, New York, home was a station on the Underground Railroad. Known as "Nancy," Ann Fitzhugh Smith frequently traveled via an enclosed carriage to permit her carriage to be used, in her absence, to convey veiled fugitives on their way to Canada.

Ann, the ninth of twelve children, was reared in the slave state of Maryland by the William Frisby Fitzhugh family, owners of over 60 slaves. When she was about twelve in 1817, the family sold their Maryland property, most of their slaves, and moved to near Rochester.

In 1822, Fitzhugh married Gerrit Smith. She was devout and was influential in her husband's religious conversion and beliefs about social reform and slavery. They had met because a brother of Gerrit's first wife, Wealtha Backus, had married Ann's sister Rebecca in 1819.

== Abolitionist ==
The Smith household hosted both abolitionist and early suffrage meetings in the pre-Civil War period. As a child in Chewsville, near Hagerstown, Maryland, she was given a slave, Harriet Sims, who was sold and was further enslaved in Kentucky, with her spouse Samuel Russell. Ann and Gerrit located the Russells, purchased their freedom in 1841, and aided them in settling at Peterboro.

The Smith couple had joined the abolition movement fully in October 1835, after a meeting of the New York State Anti-Slavery Society in Utica, New York, was forcibly broken up by local pro-slavery sympathizers. The couple interceded from the audience, and offered the Peterboro mansion as a safe haven to reconvene the gathering. There was no other offer. As the crowd that showed up was too large for Smith's house, the meeting was moved to the largest building in Peterboro, the Presbyterian Church.

While Ann's daughter Elizabeth attended a Quaker school in Philadelphia, Ann stayed in the city for extended periods during 1836-37 and 1839. These stays brought Ann into the circle of Lucretia and James Mott, abolitionists C.C. Burleigh and Mary Grew. Ann and her daughter taught Sunday school in one of Philadelphia's African-American communities.

== The Gerrit and Ann Fitzhugh Smith household ==
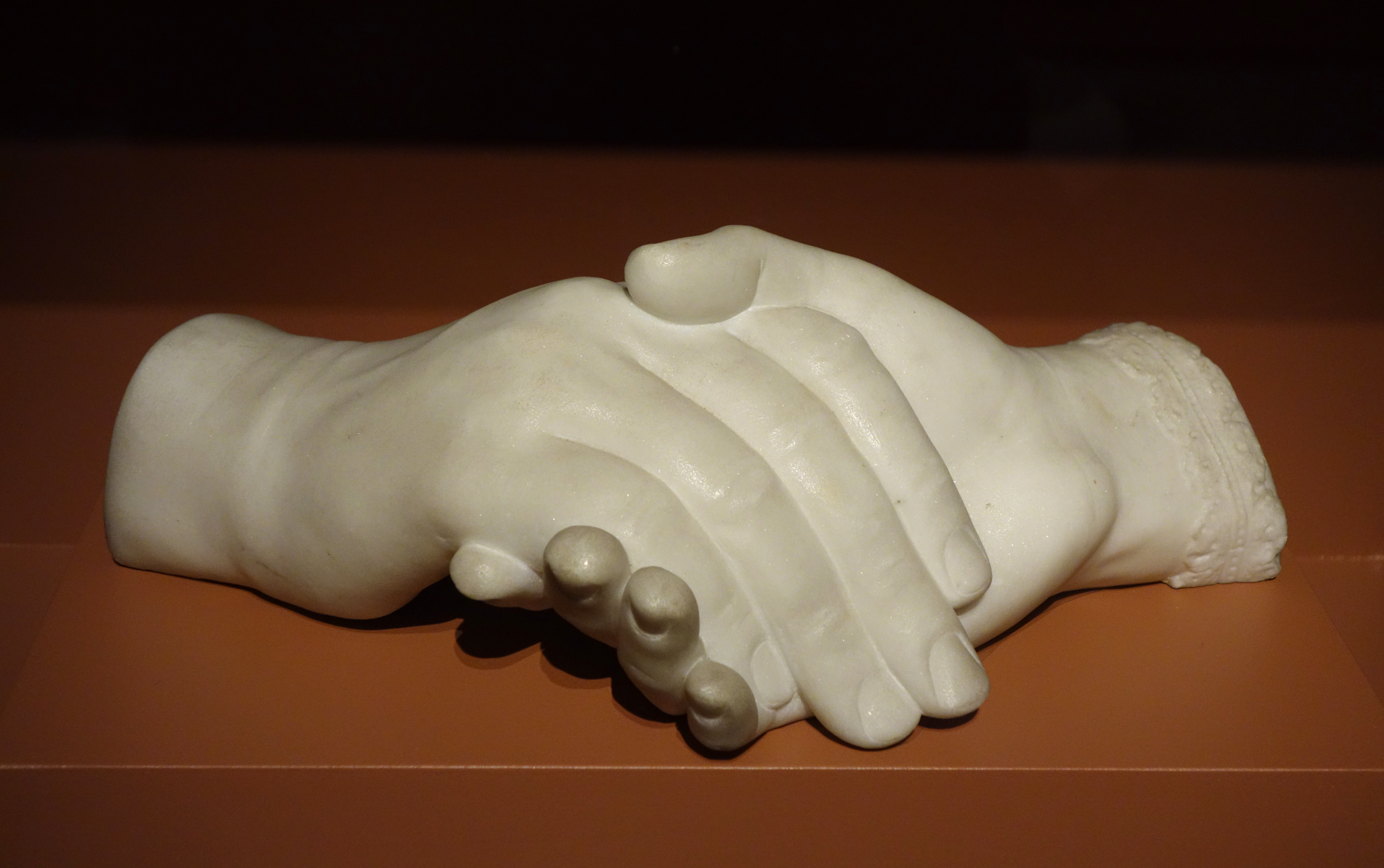
Clasped Hands of Gerrit and Ann Smith, by Edmonia Lewis, 1872

Ann was seventeen when she married Smith. According to one historian, "Ann brought warmth and cheerful serenity to her new home, and she and Gerrit had a very loving marriage, 'Heaven has broke loose!' Gerrit once exclaimed when Ann entered the room."

The Smiths lived in a large frame house facing Peterboro green. It was built in the hall-and-parlour style, with a large central hall front to back. The library of about 2,000 volumes, dining room, and kitchen flanked the central hall on one side; a parlour and conservatory lay on the other. The Smiths emphasized equality, simplicity, intellectualism, and spirituality in their domestic life. After 1835, the two supported the free-produce movement, and would not serve food grown with slave labor.

During the 1830s, the Smiths deemphasized their Calvinist theology and began exploring the perfectionist and ultraist beliefs common in the Christian Union movement. This led to their founding "free churches" at Oswego and Peterboro, New York, in 1839 and 1843 respectively.

== The Fitzhughs of the Hive ==
Ann Fitzhugh Smith was daughter of Colonel William Frisby Fitzhugh, proprietor of "The Hive" at Chewsville, Maryland, in Washington County, Maryland, near Hagerstown. William Fitzhugh, with Nathaniel Rochester and Charles Carroll, purchased a 100-acre tract at the Genesee Falls, later to become Rochester, New York. William D. Fitzhugh descended paternally from William Fitzhugh of Bedford, England, born in 1570. Henry Fitzhugh, also of Bedford, was born to the eponymous William in 1615. The first Colonel William Fitzhugh, son of Henry, was also born in 1651 at Bedford.

The first Colonel William emigrated to Westmoreland County, Virginia. He married Sarah Tucker (May 1, 1674), and died in 1701. His son, George Fitzhugh, farmed in Stafford County, Virginia, and was spouse to Mary Mason. The next Colonel William Fitzhugh, also of Stafford County, Virginia, was George's son born on January 11, 1721. He was Ann Fitzhugh Smith's grandfather and died February 11, 1798. He married Mrs. Anne Rousby (1727–1793), née Frisby, of Cecil County, Maryland, on January 7, 1752. She was born September 15, 1727, and died March 26, 1793. Colonel William Fitzhugh (1761–1839) of the Hive Ann's father, was born in Calvert County, Maryland.

Ann's mother, Ann Hughes (1771–1828), was daughter to iron-mongering entrepreneur Daniel Hughes of Washington County, Maryland. Ann Hughes married Colonel William at Saint John's Episcopal Church, Hagerstown, on October 18, 1789. The Fitzhughs and the Hughes were communicants at Saint John's Episcopal Church, Hagerstown, Maryland. The Ascension Window in St. John's north transept was donated in memory of Ann Fitzhugh's mother. Their daughter Ann, and her spouse Gerrit, were relatively secure financially, except immediately after the Panic of 1837. After that crash, the Smiths moved from the Peterboro mansion to a cottage. Both Ann and her daughter. Elizabeth, clerked in Gerrit Smith's land office to economize.

Ann and Gerrit Smith joined the Peterboro Presbyterian Church in 1826. They had seven children, five of whom died young. Ann's surviving children were Elizabeth, mother of Gerrit Smith Miller, and Greene (1842–1886).

== Death ==
Gerrit Smith died in 1874 while staying in New York City. Ann returned to the Peterboro home after tending to family affairs in Manhattan, where "the climate of the Peterboro hills was fatal to her".
