= Radical Abolitionist Party =

1850s abolitionist political party

- Founded: 1855; 171 years ago
- Dissolved: 1859; 167 years ago
- Preceded by: Liberty Party
- Succeeded by: Radical Democratic Party
- Ideology: Abolitionism

The Radical Abolitionist Party (also known as the Radical Political Abolition Party) was a political party formed by abolitionists in the United States in the decade preceding the American Civil War as part of a reaction to the Kansas-Nebraska Act. By the start of the Civil War in 1861, the party had mostly faded, as the national debate over Slavery in the United States shifted and other parties (such as the Republican Party) absorbed its more moderate elements.

== Background ==
=== Political abolitionism ===
American abolitionists were slow to enter electoral politics. Women and Black men dominated the membership of the American Anti-Slavery Society (AASS) in the 1830s and were legally barred from voting. William Lloyd Garrison opposed participation in the electoral system based on his philosophy of nonresistance. By 1839, a growing number of abolitionists favored direct political action through an antislavery third party. Political abolitionists held the Albany convention and nominated James G. Birney for president in the 1840 United States presidential election. Birney's campaign became the basis for the Liberty Party, which grew rapidly in the years leading up to the 1844 United States presidential election. After 1844, cooperation with antislavery Whigs and Democrats increasingly divided the party. Most Liberty men supported the Free Soil Party in the 1848 United States presidential election, while a faction led by William Goodell and Gerrit Smith sought to preserve the Liberty Party as an independent force.

The Liberty Party declined precipitously after 1848, and by 1852 the party was effectively dead. The American and Foreign Anti-Slavery Society (AFASS) disbanded, while some Black Liberty Party veterans began to advocate emigration or political violence. Passage of the Kansas–Nebraska Act revived the political abolitionist movement in 1854 and led radical political abolitionists to make plans for a new organization.

=== Antislavery constitutionalism ===
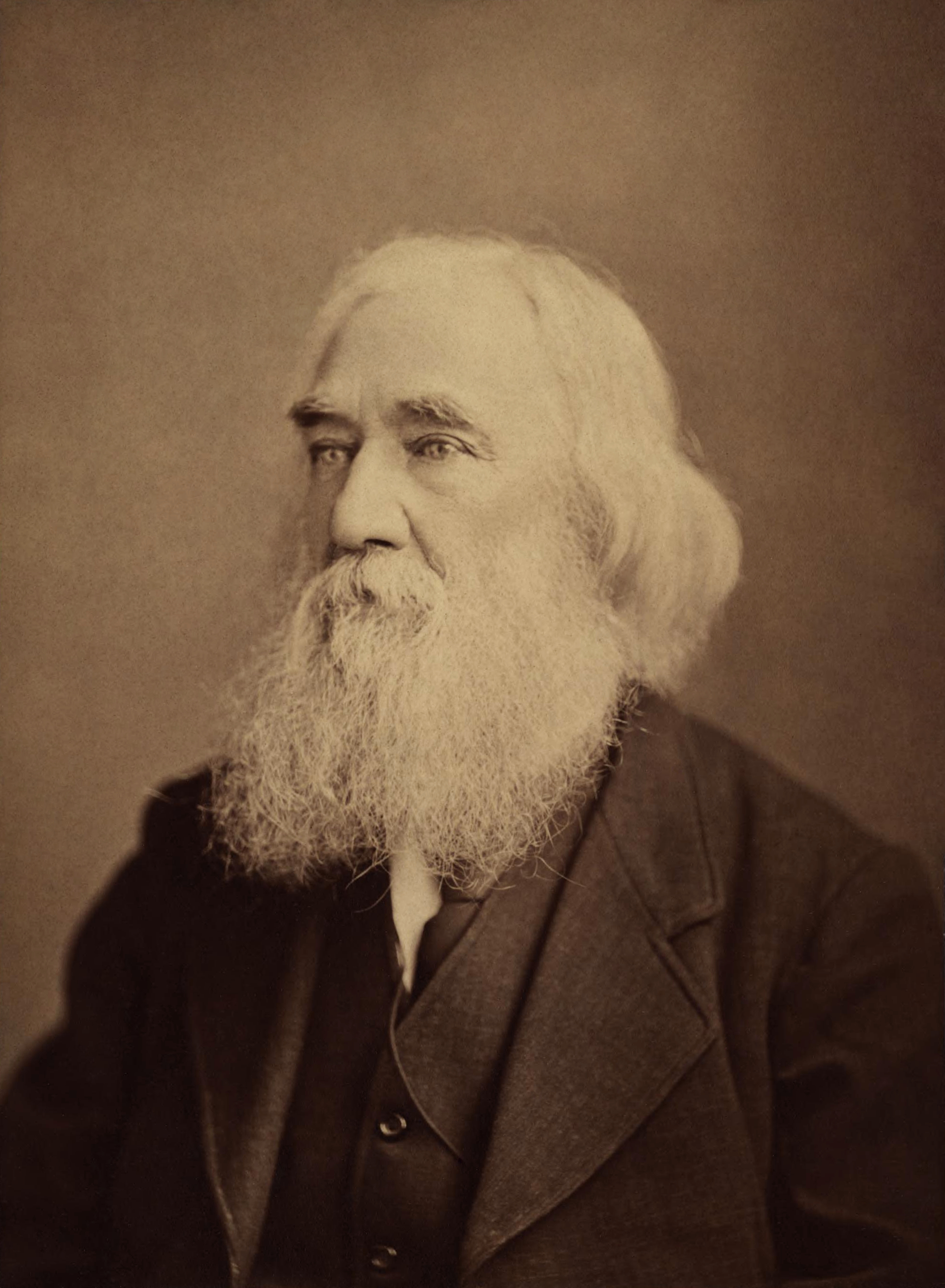
Lysander Spooner, author of The Unconstitutionality of Slavery.

Alvan Stewart first published his antislavery interpretation of the U.S. Constitution in 1837. Stewart argued slavery violated the due process clause of the Fifth Amendment to the United States Constitution and that the United States Congress could abolish it. Stewart's ideas went against the Garrisonian orthodoxy on the Constitution, which it held to be a proslavery document, as well as the views of other political abolitionists who considered slavery a "creature of local law". The Liberty Party's 1843 platform avoided addressing the constitutionality of slavery and instead called for abolition in the territories of the United States and the District of Columbia, where federal authority over slavery was widely recognized.

Goodell and Lysander Spooner published their own works on antislavery constitutionalism during the 1840s. Spooner's ideas in particular were highly influential, and he emerged as the "leading authority" on the subject with the publication of his 1845 work, The Unconstitutionality of Slavery. Writing for a popular audience, Spooner argued that slavery was incompatible with natural law and could only be established by a positive and unambiguous declaration. He used examples from colonial, state, and federal law and constitutional documents to show that slavery in the United States lacked explicit legal sanction and was therefore unconstitutional. Although less sophisticated, Goodell's 1844 book was extremely popular with political abolitionists and shaped the platform of the Liberty League, the caucus of radical political abolitionists that attempted to continue the Liberty Party after 1848.

=== Abolitionist violence ===
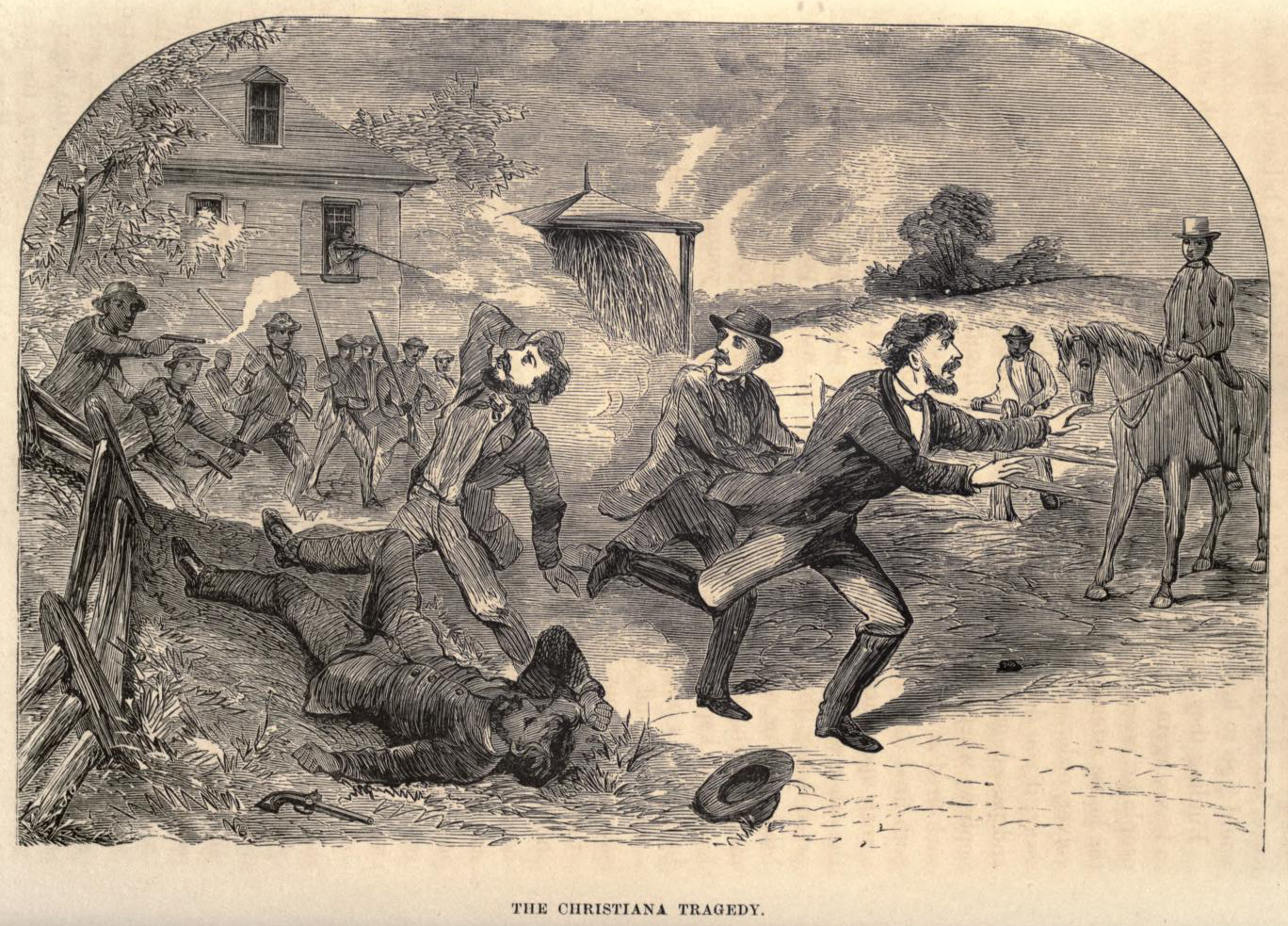
The Christiana Riot, an example of armed resistance to the Fugitive Slave Act of 1850

The use of violence was controversial among abolitionists before the 1850s. The first national convention of the AASS pledged the society to pursue abolition by exclusively non-violent means. Black abolitionists discussed the need for violent resistance following Denmark Vesey's planned 1822 slave rebellion. In his influential 1829 pamphlet, the abolitionist David Walker urged Black Americans to "kill or be killed" when met with proslavery violence. In the 1840s, Henry Highland Garnet called for enslaved people to take up arms against their enslavers and published a new edition of Walker's Appeal. Other Black abolitionists opposed Garnet's call for violence, including Frederick Douglass, Charles Lenox Remond, and Maria Weston Chapman, who continued to support non-violent abolitionism.

Passage of the Fugitive Slave Act of 1850 radicalized Northern opposition to slavery and led some abolitionists to rethink their stance on political violence. Douglass joined prominent abolitionists who counseled violent resistance to the law, saying, "the only way to make the Fugitive Slave Law a dead letter, is to make half a dozen or more dead kidnappers." The 1851 Christiana Riot, the Jerry Rescue, and the capture and re-enslavement of Anthony Burns led Black abolitionists in particular to see violence as necessary to the antislavery struggle.

== History ==
=== Creation, 1855 ===
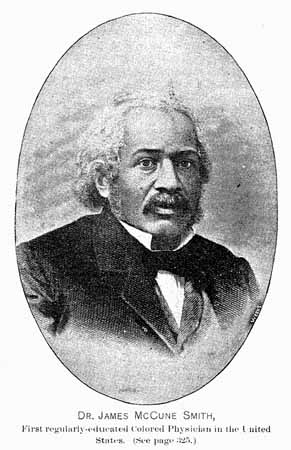
James McCune Smith, president of the 1855 convention of Radical Political Abolitionists.

The 1854 United States elections saw the Anti-Nebraska movement gain more than 100 seats in the United States House of Representatives. In the aftermath of these elections, Goodell launched an attempt to revive radical political abolitionism in New York, where a remnant of the Liberty Party had survived the national party's collapse. In March 1855, he organized the New York City Abolition Society to promote antislavery constitutionalism. The following month, Goodell signed a call for radical political abolitionists to meet in Syracuse, New York, on June 26. The document criticized the existing political parties and the AASS for failing to pursue immediate emancipation through the political process. Asserting "the right and duty to wield the political power of the nation for the overthrow of every part and parcel of American Slavery," it called for delegates to discuss ways to support lecturers and periodicals devoted to political abolitionism and antislavery constitutionalism.

Delegates attended the first national convention of radical political abolitionists from June 26 to 28, 1855, in Syracuse. The list of delegates included Liberty League veterans and members of the defunct AFASS, including Douglass, Gerrit Smith, Lewis Tappan, Simeon Jocelyn, George Whipple, William Whiting, Charles C. Foote, Samuel Joseph May, and Jermain Wesley Loguen. James McCune Smith presided over the meeting, becoming the first Black American to lead a national political convention. Others present included John Brown, the abolitionist partisan recently arrived from Kansas Territory. John Pierpont and future socialist editor James McIntosh were unable to attend and sent letters which were read to the convention.

The convention's main achievement was to establish the principles of a future national organization dedicated to the immediate abolition of slavery through the electoral system. Most of the first two days were devoted to discussion of the movement's founding documents. A heated debate on events in Bleeding Kansas dominated the third day. Gerrit Smith read two letters from Brown's sons describing the situation in Kansas, where armed conflict between proslavery and antislavery settlers erupted following passage of the Kansas–Nebraska Act. Brown appeared in person and made a passionate appeal for money and arms to equip the antislavery insurgency. Douglass and Gerrit Smith spoke in support of Brown's motion, which Goodell and Tappan opposed. The convention approved the principle of armed resistance, but voted to limit their own efforts to the ballot box. At Douglass's urging, delegates contributed $60 and several muskets, bayonets, pistols, and broadswords to Brown's expedition.

The delegates named a nine-member Central Abolition Board to serve until a future convention of the proposed organization. The founding convention of the American Abolition Society (AAS) met subsequently from October 23 to 25, 1855, in Boston. At least 1,500 people attended the gathering, which named Gerrit Smith president of the society. The AAS sponsored a variety of activities intended to spread its moral and political philosophy, employing lecturers, distributing literature, and publishing a monthly periodical, the Radical Abolitionist. Dissatisfied with the Republican Party's acceptance of the constitutionality of slavery, members proposed forming a "National Abolition Party" to campaign in the 1856 United States elections.

=== Rise, 1856–58 ===
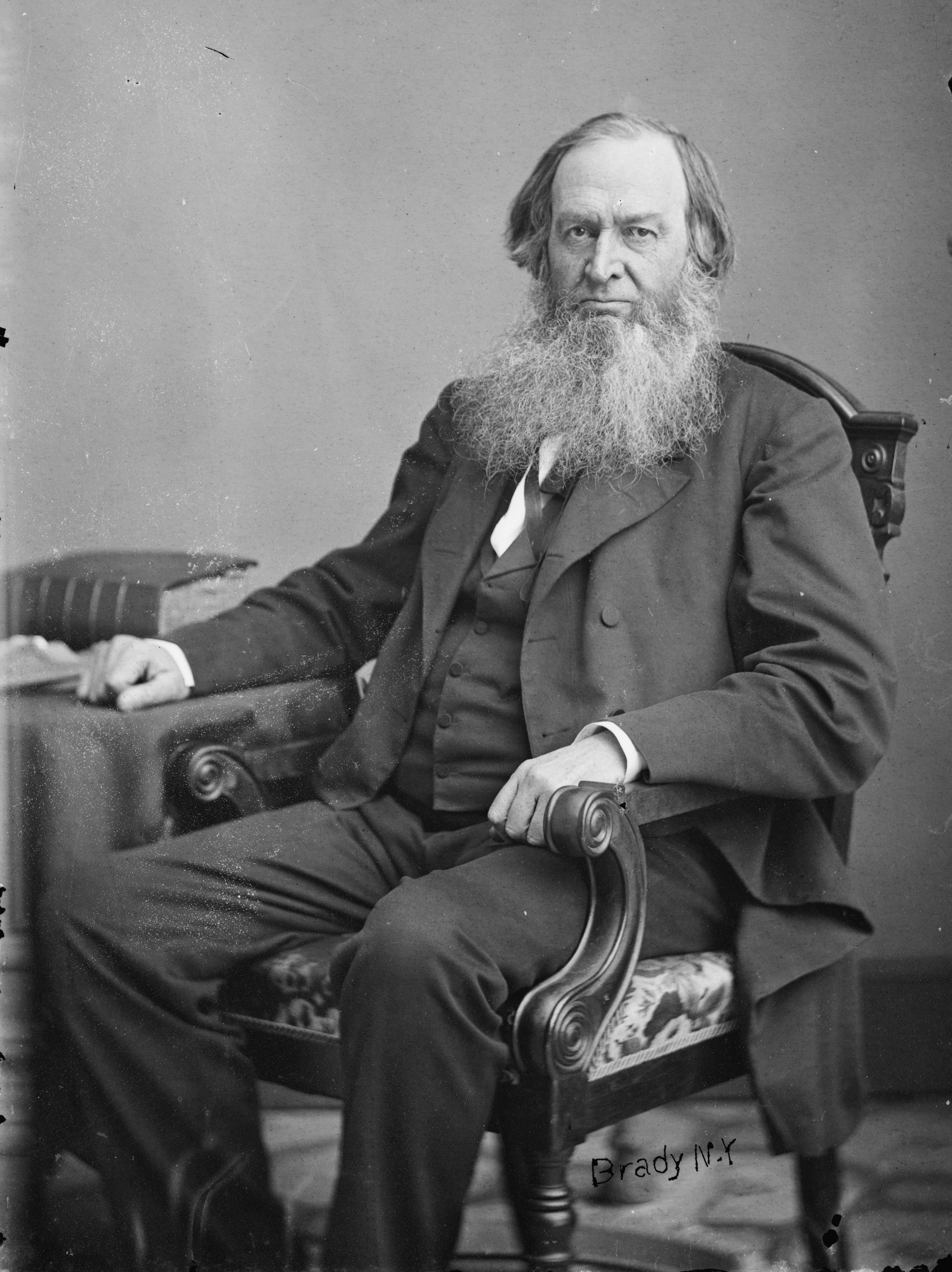
Gerrit Smith, three-time presidential candidate and fusion candidate for governor of New York in 1858.

The 1856 Radical Abolitionist National Convention met in Syracuse on May 28. The presidential nominating convention was sponsored by the AAS. Delegates included representatives of the National Reform Association and future socialist politician Peter H. Clark. The convention nominated Gerrit Smith for president and Douglass for vice president in the 1856 United States presidential election; because both men came from New York, Douglass was later replaced on the ticket by Pennsylvanian Samuel McFarland. Most of the discussion focussed on the ongoing violence in Kansas and the recent caning of Charles Sumner. Douglass "summarized the prevailing mood of his party" by calling for abolitionists to take up arms to overthrow the Slave Power. While Smith favored armed resistance, Goodell and Tappan continued to argue for strictly non-violent measures. The debate exposed a rift within the AAS that threatened to split the society between supporters of violent and non-violent tactics.

The popularity of the Republican Party in the Northern United States meant that Smith's candidacy was a "formality." Although they remained critical of the Republican platform, the prospect for a Republican presidential victory led some Radical Abolitionists to lend their support to the larger party. The Radical Abolitionist convention took place concurrently with the New York Republican state convention in Syracuse, and some abolitionists attended both gatherings. Douglass endorsed the Republican presidential candidate, John C. Frémont, in August, while Smith donated $500 to Frémont's campaign. Smith received 320 votes in the presidential election, less than 1 percent of the total. Frémont received more than 1.3 million ballots and 114 electoral votes, all from the free states, where the Republicans won a plurality of the popular vote despite losing the election.

In the aftermath of Frémont's defeat, Goodell suggested that the Republicans could collapse, allowing the Radical Abolitionists to take over the mantle of the largest antislavery party. The party grew noticeably during 1856–57, adding affiliates in New York, Pennsylvania, Vermont, Illinois, and Ohio. Women and Black abolitionists participated in this growth: Charles Lenox Remond presided over the 1857 New York Radical Abolitionist state convention, and Sarah Parker Remond, Sarah Clark, and Susan B. Anthony spoke at the meeting. Operating as the party's activist wing, the AAS expanded its activity during this period, including by orchestrating a campaign to mail copies of Spooner's Unconstitutionality of Slavery to every member of Congress. These efforts gained a series of prominent endorsements, including by Charles Grandison Finney, the celebrated revivalist; John Gregg Fee, the Kentucky abolitionist and missionary; and U.S. representative Amos P. Granger.

New York Radical Abolitionists attempted to form alliances with other reform groups during the 1858 New York gubernatorial election. Three hundred abolitionists, temperance, and land reformers met in Syracuse on August 4 and nominated Gerrit Smith for governor on the People's state ticket. Smith campaigned tirelessly during the next three months, traveling 4,000 miles and speaking to 53 town hall meetings across the state. Observers predicted Smith might receive 25,000 votes, and Smith himself expected as many as 50,000 votes. The possibility that New York's 11,500 Black voters might swing to Smith led New York Republicans to adopt a stronger position on slavery in the last week of the campaign. The final result fell far short of expectations, as Smith received just 5,470 votes versus the Republicans' 247,953. Although Smith deeply regretted the loss, others considered his campaign a success. Following the election, Joshua Reed Giddings wrote to Smith that despite his defeat, "I am convinced you never did better service to the cause."

=== Decline, 1859–60 ===
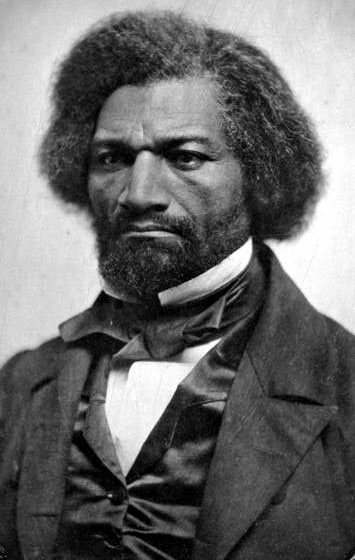
Frederick Douglass, abolitionist editor and candidate for the United States Electoral College from New York in 1860.

Radical political abolitionism declined quickly during the winter of 1858–59. The movement was reliant on Gerrit Smith's financial support, and platform commitments to emancipation and equal rights limited its appeal. The Radical Abolitionist ceased publication in December 1858, and the AAS formally disbanded in February 1859. Despite the collapse of their organization, Radical Abolitionists continued to promote their ideas. Henry Cheever organized the Church Anti-Slavery Society (CASS) in 1859 to convert the Protestant clergy to abolitionism. The CASS included several Radical Abolitionists and was affiliated with Goodell's latest periodical, the Principia, which replaced the Radical Abolitionist as the movement's official mouthpiece. Radical Abolitionists also continued their involvement with the American Missionary Association.

Douglass led an effort to revive the Radical Abolitionist Party during the 1860 United States presidential election. He spoke at an abolitionist gathering in Boston on May 29 that proposed running a third party ticket in the fall elections. The 1860 Radical Abolitionist National Convention met in Syracuse on August 29. Taking place in the aftermath of the 1860 Republican National Convention, the gathering condemned the cautious Republican platform as "inadequate" to restore the rights of enslaved people. Gerrit Smith won the presidential nomination over Goodell, who became the party's candidate for governor of New York; Samuel McFarland was once again nominated for vice president. Douglass headed the party's ticket in New York as an at-large presidential elector, the first Black American to hold this position.

Following the convention, Douglass wrote that 10,000 votes for Smith would do more to abolish slavery than 2 million for Abraham Lincoln, the Republican presidential candidate. He secured Smith's endorsement by the Political Anti-Slavery Convention that met in Worcester, Massachusetts, in September. Smith, however, regarded the presidential campaign with mixed emotions. In his letter to the national convention, Smith expressed doubt that white Americans would vote for an abolitionist candidate and predicted that "slavery must be left to go out in blood." Smith's letter caused some Radical Abolitionists to disavow his candidacy, including Goodell, who withheld his endorsement for most of the fall, and McFarland, who declined the vice-presidential nomination late in the campaign. Ohio Radical Abolitionists made no mention of Smith at their state convention and instead nominated a slate of unpledged electors. The Radical Abolitionist ticket received 176 votes in three states, including 136 for the Ohio electors. Lincoln received over 1.8 million votes, less than 40 percent of the total, but carried 180 electoral votes from the free states and thus the election.

== Ideology ==
=== Distinctions from contemporary parties ===
The primary ideology of the Radical Abolition Party's platform was based in an active form of abolitionism that was distinct from how other political parties of the time approached the issue of slavery. They were ideologically furthest distanced with the Whigs, Democrats, and Know-Nothing parties that supported and actively worked to perpetuate the institution of slavery. The Free Soilers and Republican parties were ideologically closer but held less radical views. Kellie Carter Jackson argues that “while Free Soilers and Republicans were playing defense in terms of slavery's expansion, Radical Abolitionists were taking up an offensive stance. They firmly advocated for African American rights, including citizenship." One could assume the Radical Abolitionist Party were ideologically closest to the American Anti-Slavery Society (or Garrison Party). The Radical Abolitionists believed the Garrison Party's primary strategy of moral suasion was insufficient to eradicate slavery. They also disagreed with the Garrison Party's view regarding the Constitution as the Radical Abolitionists interpreted the Constitution as a fundamentally anti-slavery document.

=== Constitutional argument for abolishing slavery ===
William Goodell contributed his formulation of the Constitutional argument against slavery which was grounded in his interpretation of multiple provisions:

- The Due Process Clause of the Fifth Amendment
- The Guarantee Clause (provided for all states a republican form of government, republican government is inconsistent with slavery).
- The Commerce Clause gave Congress the right to determine what was property and prohibit the slave trade among the states
- The Declaration of Independence was part of US Constitutional Law and it prohibited slavery by its equality clause.

John Stauffer argues Goodell's constitutional argument is based on John Quincy Adams' original interpretation, which did not allow immediate emancipation as a realistic possibility. Instead, he believed it would eventually happen through a more gradual process.

The Dred Scott decision hindered Radical Abolitionists' efforts to convince people of the constitutional argument. The majority opinion by Chief Justice Taney and dissenting opinion by Justice Curtis and Justice McLean directly countered the Radical Abolitionists' constitutional interpretation.

=== Use of violence ===
Scholars have different interpretations of another distinct feature of the Radical Abolition Party which is their affirmation of using violence as a strategy.

Perkal contends “the question of using violent means to abolish slavery was the most divisive issue at the Convention."

Stauffer argues “the party's platform specifically affirmed violence as a way to end slavery and oppression.” His description of the events at the inaugural convention suggests there was overwhelming support from attendants after letters written by John Brown's sons were read out loud. The letters described the ongoing violence in Kansas following the Kansas-Nebraska Act. Stauffer goes on to describe how John Brown received fervent support including funds and weapons.

Jackson's interpretation aligns with Stauffer as she describes how for Radical Abolitionists, “violence was justified and even sanctioned from a biblical standpoint." She goes on to share a powerful quote from James McCune Smith,

“Our white brethren cannot understand us unless we speak to them in their own language; they recognize only the philosophy of force”

== Legacy ==
Stauffer argues that despite the Radical Abolition Party's brief time, their existence has "…deep cultural relevance…unprecedented moment of interracial unity and collapsing of racial barriers.”

Perkal also emphasizes the party's significance despite the modest results from campaign activities by arguing the party had "an important role in the antislavery movement of the 1850's. The radicals were able to exert some moral influence upon the Republican Party, perhaps preventing further compromise with abolitionist ideals."

== Electoral history ==
=== Presidential ===
| Election | Ticket | | Election results | | | |
| Election | Presidential nominee | Running mate | Votes | Percent | Electoral votes | Result |
|---|---|---|---|---|---|---|
| 1856 | Gerrit Smith | Samuel McFarland (Note: Replacing Frederick Douglass.) | 320 | 0.008% | 0 / 296 | Lost |
| 1860 | Gerrit Smith | Samuel McFarland (Note: Declined.) | 176 (Note: Including votes for unpledged electors on the Radical Abolitionist ticket.) | 0.004% | 0 / 303 | Lost |

== Other prominent members ==
- William Shreve Bailey
- John Brown
- William Wells Brown
- Peter H. Clark
- William H. Day
- Thomas Devyr
- Frederick Douglass
- Benjamin W. Dyer
- John Gregg Fee
- Charles C. Foote
- Stephen Symonds Foster
- Henry Highland Garnet
- William Goodell
- Jermain Wesley Loguen
- James Caleb Jackson
- Samuel Joseph May
- Parker Pillsbury
- Charles Lenox Remond
- Sarah Parker Remond
- James McCune Smith
- Elizabeth Cady Stanton
- Arthur Tappan
- Lewis Tappan
- William Whiting

== Bibliography ==
=== Primary sources ===
- Central Abolition Board (1855). Proceedings of the Convention of Radical Political Abolitionists [...]. New York.
- Walker, David (1830). Walker's Appeal, in Four Articles [...]. Boston.

=== Secondary sources ===
- Ali, Omar H. (2008). In the Balance of Power: Independent Black Politics and Third Party Movements in the United States. Athens, OH: Ohio University Press.
- Brown, Ira V. (July 1987). "Pennsylvania, 'Immediate Emancipation,' and the Birth of the American Anti-Slavery Society". Pennsylvania History. 54 (3): 163–78.
- Dubin, Michael J. (2002). United States Presidential Elections, 1788-1860. Jefferson, NC: McFarland & Company.
- Foner, Eric (1995). Free Soil, Free Labor, Free Men: The Ideology of the Republican Party before the Civil War. New York: Oxford University Press.
- Foner, Philip S. (1969). Frederick Douglass: A Biography. New York: Citadel Press.
- Gowler, Steve (December 2018). "Radical Orthodoxy: William Goodell and the Abolition of American Slavery". New England Quarterly. 91 (4): 592–624.
- Harlow, Ralph Volney (1939). Gerrit Smith: Philanthropist and Reformer. New York: Henry Holt & Company.
- Jackson, Kellie Carter (2019). Force and Freedom: Black Abolitionists and the Politics of Violence. Philadelphia: University of Pennsylvania Press.
- Johnson, Reinhard O. (2009). The Liberty Party 1840-48: Antislavery Third Party Politics in the United States. Baton Rouge: Louisiana State University Press.
- McPherson, James M. (1988). Battle Cry of Freedom: The Civil War Era. New York: Oxford University Press.
- McPherson, James M. (1964). The Struggle for Equality: Abolitionists and the Negro in the Civil War and Reconstruction. Princeton: Princeton University Press.
- Perkal, M. Leon (Winter 1980). "American Abolition Society: A Viable Alternative to the Republican Party?". Journal of Negro History. 65 (1): 55–71.
- Perry, Lewis (1973). Radical Abolitionism: Anarchy and the Government of God in Antislavery Thought. Ithaca, NY: Cornell University Press.
- Sewell, Richard H. (1976). Ballots for Freedom: Antislavery Politics in the United States, 1837–1860. New York: Oxford University Press. LCCN 75-25464.
- Sinha, Manisha (2016). The Slave's Cause: A History of Abolition. New Haven: Yale University Press.
- Stauffer, John (2001). The Black Hearts of Men: Radical Abolitionists and the Transformation of Race. Cambridge: Harvard University Press.
- Taylor, Nikki M. (2013). America's First Black Socialist: The Radical Life of Peter H. Clark. Lexington: University Press of Kentucky.
- Wiecek, William M. (1977). The Sources of Antislavery Constitutionalism in America, 1760–1848. Ithaca, NY: Cornell University Press.
