= Gerrit Smith =

American abolitionist and politician (1797–1874)

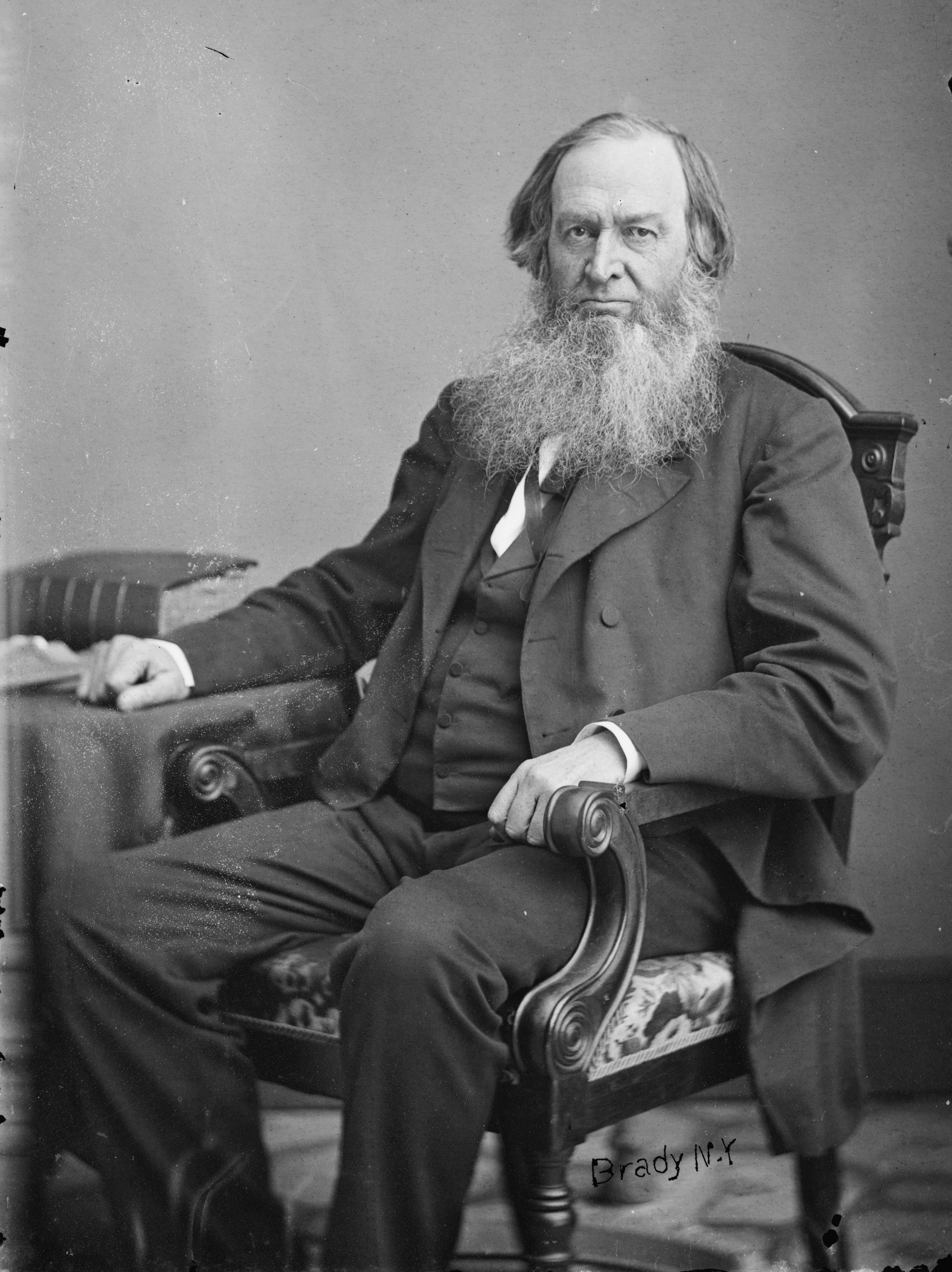

Member of the U.S. House of Representatives from New York's 22nd district
- In office March 4, 1853 – August 7, 1854
- Preceded by: Henry Bennett
- Succeeded by: Henry C. Goodwin

Personal details
- Born: March 6, 1797 Utica, New York, U.S.
- Died: December 28, 1874 (aged 77) New York City, U.S.
- Party: Liberty (1840–55); Free Soil (1852); Radical Abolitionist (1855–60)
- Spouse(s): Wealtha Ann Backus (Jan. 1819 – Aug. 1819; her death) Ann Carroll Fitzhugh (m. 1822)
- Children: Elizabeth Smith Miller and Greene Smith
- Occupation: social reformer, abolitionist, politician, businessman, public intellectual, philanthropist

Gerrit Smith (March 6, 1797 – December 28, 1874), also spelled Gerritt Smith, was an American social reformer, abolitionist, businessman, public intellectual, and philanthropist. Married to Ann Carroll Fitzhugh, Smith was a candidate for President of the United States in 1848, 1856, and 1860. He served a single term in the House of Representatives from 1853 to 1854.

First valedictorian of the new Hamilton College (1818), and married to the daughter of the college president, he had "a fine mind", with "a strong literary bent and a marked gift for public speaking". He was called "the sage of Peterboro." He was well liked, even by his political enemies. The many who appeared at his house in Peterboro, invited or not, were well received. (In 1842 the names of 132 visitors were recorded.)

Smith, one of the wealthiest men in New York, was committed to political reform, and above all to the elimination of slavery. So many fugitive slaves came to Peterboro to ask for his help (usually, in reaching Canada) that there is a book about them. Peterboro was, because of Smith, the capital of the abolition movement. The only assembly of escaped slaves (as opposed to free Blacks) ever to meet in the United States—the Fugitive Slave Convention of 1850—took place in neighboring Cazenovia because Peterboro was too small for the meeting.

Smith was also, and less successfully, a temperance activist, and a women's rights suffrage advocate. He was a significant financial contributor to the Liberty Party and the Republican Party throughout his life. Besides making substantial donations of both land and money to create Timbuctoo, an African-American community in North Elba, New York, he was involved in the temperance movement and the colonization movement, before abandoning colonization in favor of abolitionism, the immediate freeing of all the slaves. He was a member of the Secret Six who financially supported John Brown's raid at Harpers Ferry, in 1859. Brown's farm, in North Elba, was on land he bought from Smith.

== Early life ==
=== Forebears ===
Smith was born in Utica, New York, when it was still an unincorporated village. He was one of four children of Peter Gerrit Smith (1768–1837), whose ancestors were from Holland (Gerrit is a Dutch name), and Elizabeth (Livingston) Smith (†1818), daughter of Col. James Livingston and Elizabeth (Simpson) Livingston. Peter, an actor as a young man, and who coached Gerrit in public speaking, was a slave owner, the first judge in Madison County, and the largest landholder in New York State. "In partnership with John Jacob Astor in the fur trade and alone in real estate, Peter Smith [had] managed to amass a considerable fortune. Peter was the county judge of Madison County, New York, and has been described as 'easily its leading citizen'." He was "a devout and emotionally religious man". From 1822 on, Peter Smith was intensely engaged in the work of the Bible and tract societies."

The author of the only book on Peter calls him greedy, self-centered, driven by the search for profits, and someone who did not like people who were not like him: white, male, and Dutch. He was not philanthropic. "Other people...[were] objects to be used for his own benefit, especially if they were culturally different than himself. Native Americans, poor people, black people, and non-Christians he viewed with disrespect."

Peter spent his last years in a religious fanaticism that led him to give up all his worldly goods. He turned over a $400,000 business [equivalent to $8,413,043 in 2025] to his son Gerrit in 1819 and bequeathed $800,000 more [equivalent to $17,916,667 in 2025] to his children in 1837. Gerrit also inherited 50,000 acres (20,000 ha) of land from his father, and at one point he owned 750,000 acres (300,000 ha), an area bigger than Rhode Island. Another source says that he inherited from his father over one million acres in Virginia, Pennsylvania, and New York. An 1846 listing of lands he was offering for sale fills 45 pages.

Gerrit had an older brother, Peter Smith Jr., who was a problem drinker that died young, and a younger brother Adolph, who was "clinically insane and confined to a nearby institution."

Smith's maternal aunt, Margaret Livingston, was married to Judge Daniel Cady. Their daughter Elizabeth Cady Stanton, a founder and leader of the women's suffrage movement, was Smith's first cousin. Elizabeth Cady met her future husband, Henry Stanton, also an active abolitionist, at the Smith family home in Peterboro, New York. Established in 1795, the town had been founded by and named for Gerrit Smith's father, Peter Smith, who built the family homestead there in 1804. Another source says that Peter Smith moved to Whitesboro "about 1803" and that he removed to Peterboro in 1806. Gerrit came there when he was 9.

=== Gerrit as a young man ===
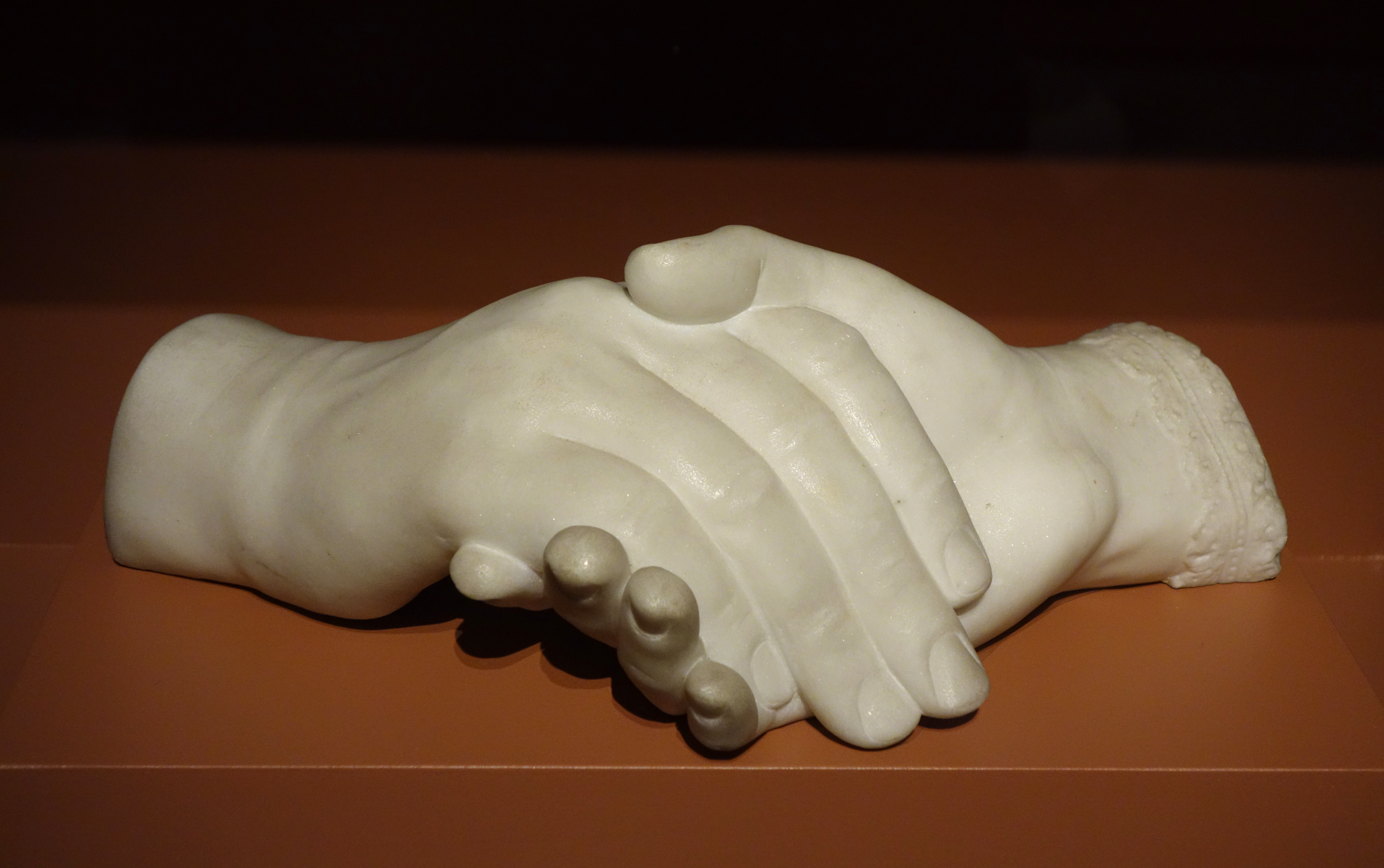
Clasped Hands of Gerrit and Ann Smith, by Edmonia Lewis, 1872

Gerrit was described as "tall, magnificently built and magnificently proportioned, his large head superbly set on his shoulders;" he "might have served as a model for a Greek god in the days when man deified beauty and worshipped it." He attended Hamilton Oneida Academy in Clinton, Oneida County, New York, and graduated with honors from its successor Hamilton College in 1818, giving the valedictory address, and describing his stay at the college as "very active with many friends". (His father was one of the trustees.) In January 1819, he married Wealtha Ann Backus (1800–1819), daughter of Hamilton College's first President, Azel Backus D.D. (1765–1817), and sister of Frederick F. Backus (1794–1858). Wealtha died in August of the same year. In 1822, he married 16-year-old Ann Carroll Fitzhugh (1805–1879), sister of Henry Fitzhugh (1801–1866) and of Wealtha's brother's wife. Their relationship "appeared to be loving"; although Ann was a religious, church-going person who worried that Gerrit was not. They had eight children, but only Elizabeth Smith Miller (1822–1911), mother of his grandson Gerrit Smith Miller, and Greene Smith (c. 1841–1880) survived to adulthood.

In the year of his graduation, the death of his mother plunged his father, Peter, into severe depression. He withdrew from all business and vested in his second son Gerrit, who had to abandon plans for a law career, the entire charge of his estate, described as "monumental".

He became an active temperance campaigner, and attended temperance gatherings more than political ones. He claimed to have given in 1824 the first temperance speech ever in the New York State Legislature. In his hometown of Peterboro, he built one of the first temperance hotels in the country, which was not successful commercially, and was disliked by many locals.

Smith wrote of himself:

But as an extemporaneous Speaker and Debater, we do not hesitate to place him in the first class. Here his eloquence is the growth of the hour and the occasion. He warms with the subject, especially if opposed, until at the climax, his heavy voice rolling forth in ponderous volume and his large frame quivering in every muscle, he stands, like Jupiter, thundering, and shaking with his thunderbolts his throne itself.

=== Gerrit in the 1830s ===
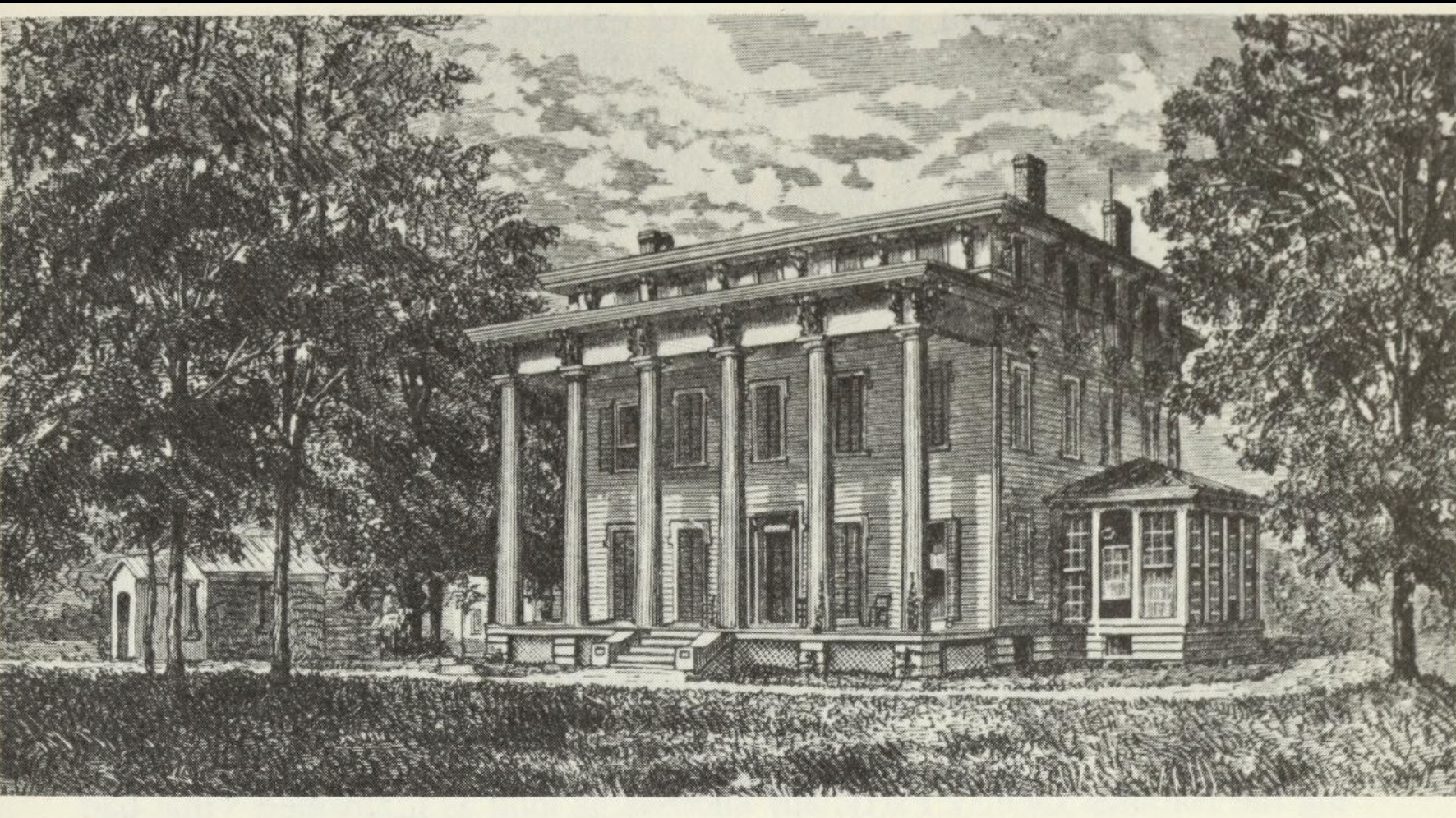
Gerrit Smith house, Peterboro, New York, from an 1878 book. The house was destroyed by fire in 1936.

He attended numerous revival meetings, and taught Sunday school. He thought of establishing a seminary for Black students. In 1834 he began a Peterboro manual labor school for Black students, along the model of nearby Oneida Institute. It had only one instructor, and it lasted only two years. Previously a supporter of the American Colonization Society, he became an abolitionist in 1835 after a mob in Utica, including New York congressman and future Attorney General Samuel Beardsley, broke up the initial meeting of the New York Anti-Slavery Society, which he attended at the urging of his friends Beriah Green and Alvan Stewart. At his invitation, the meeting continued the next day in Peterboro. He resigned as a trustee of Hamilton College "on the grounds that the school was insufficiently anti-slavery", and joined the board of and financially assisted the Oneida Institute, "a hotbed of anti-slavery activity". He contributed $9,000 (equivalent to $280,887 in 2025) to support schools in Liberia, but realized by 1835 that the American Colonization Society had no intention of abolishing slavery.

Smith was a laggard instead of a leader in changing from supporting colonization to "immediatism", immediate full abolitionism. His financial support for Jefferson Davis after the war would have been unthinkable for Garrison, Douglass, or other abolitionist leaders.

Gerrit's stately house was not only an Underground Railroad stop, it received a constant stream of visitors. (See Peterboro, New York#Gerrit Smith.) His desk was said to have belonged to Napoleon. Besides a library of 1,000 volumes, on the wall was a framed map of the Eastern Seaboard, with his extensive land-holdings marked.

== Political career ==
"It must be admitted that few men in this country have been a candidate for high office so many times and polled so few votes."

In 1840, Smith played a leading part in the organization of the Liberty Party; the name of the party was his. In the same year, their presidential candidate James G. Birney married Elizabeth Potts Fitzhugh, Smith's sister-in-law. Smith and Birney travelled to London that year to attend the World Anti-Slavery Convention in London.

Birney, but not Smith, is recorded in the commemorative painting of the event. In 1848, Smith was nominated for the Presidency by the remnant of this organization that had not been absorbed by the Free Soil Party. An "Industrial Congress" at Philadelphia also nominated him for the presidency in 1848, and the "Land Reformers" in 1856. In 1840 and again in 1858, he ran for Governor of New York on an anti-slavery platform.

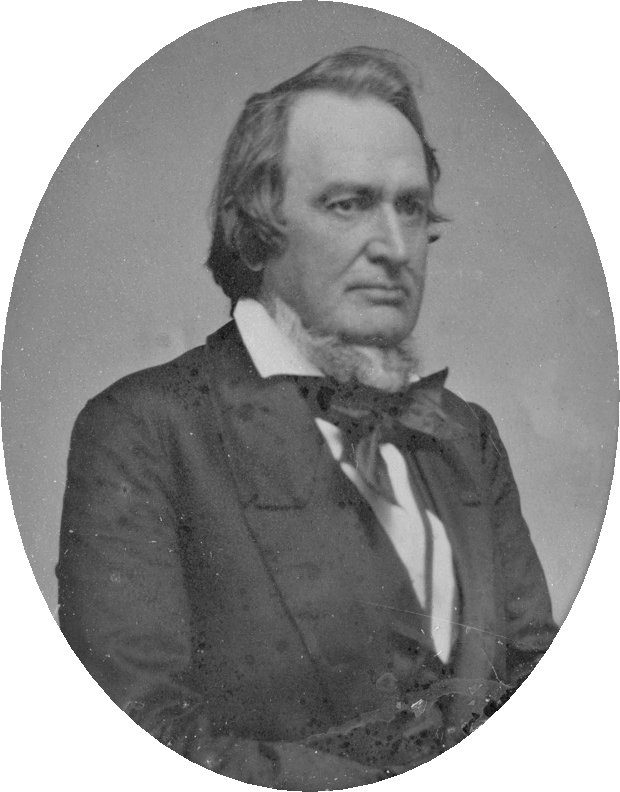
Smith made women's suffrage a plank in the Liberty Party platform on June 14–15, 1848.

On June 2, 1848, in Rochester, New York, Smith was nominated as the Liberty Party's presidential candidate. At the 1848 Liberty National Convention, held June 14–15 in Buffalo, New York, Smith gave a major address, including in his speech a demand for "universal suffrage in its broadest sense, females as well as males being entitled to vote." The delegates approved a passage in their address to the people of the United States addressing votes for women: "Neither here, nor in any other part of the world, is the right of suffrage allowed to extend beyond one of the sexes. This universal exclusion of woman...argues, conclusively, that, not as yet, is there one nation so far emerged from barbarism, and so far practically Christian, as to permit woman to rise up to the one level of the human family." Reverend Charles C. Foote was nominated as his running mate. The ticket would come in fourth place in the election, carrying 2,545 popular votes, all from New York.

At the request of friends, Smith had 3,000 copies printed of an 1851 speech in Troy in which he set forth his views of government. Smith laments the people's universal dependence on government. As a consequence of that dependence, government occupies itself "for the most part, in doing that it belongs to the people to do". He opposed tariffs, internal improvements, such as the Erie Canal, at public expense, and publicly-supported schools, which could not teach religion, which Smith thought the main function of schools. The remedy was less government, and the less, the better.

The only political office to which Smith was ever elected, and that by a very large majority, was Representative in the U.S. Congress. Smith served a single term in Congress, on the Free Soil ticket, from March 4, 1853, until the end of the session on August 7, 1854, although he said that because of his business activities he had sought neither the nomination nor his election. ("My nomination to Congress alarmed me greatly, because I believed that it would result in my election.") He made a point of resigning his seat on the last day of the session. He then published a lengthy letter to his constituents explaining his frustrations in Congress and his decision not to run for a second term. He was well liked, even by Southern members, who found him "one of the best fellows in the Capitol, as one, although well known as an abolitionist, still as one to be tolerated".

By 1855, the Liberty Party had dwindled to a small remnant of its former strength. Most of its supporters had joined the Free Soil Party in 1848, and these were absorbed into the new Republican Party during the crisis which followed the repeal of the Missouri Compromise by the Kansas–Nebraska Act. Political abolitionists who still wished to maintain a separate organization met at Syracuse, New York, in June and formed the Radical Abolitionist Party as an alternative to the Republicans and the Garrisonian American Anti-Slavery Society. Smith was nominated as the presidential candidate of the new party in 1856. The Radical Abolitionists ran electors in New York and Ohio, where Smith polled 321 votes, finishing far behind the Republican candidate John C. Fremont and the successful Democratic nominee, James Buchanan.

Smith was again the presidential candidate of the Radical Abolitionists in 1860. A convention of one hundred delegates was held in Convention Hall, Syracuse, New York, on August 29, 1860. Delegates were in attendance from New York, Pennsylvania, New Jersey, Michigan, Illinois, Ohio, Kentucky, and Massachusetts. Several of the delegates were women. Smith, despite his poor health, fought William Goodell in regard to the nomination for the presidency. In the end, Smith was nominated for president and Samuel McFarland from Pennsylvania was nominated for vice president. Radical Abolitionist electors polled 176 votes in Illinois, Indiana, and Ohio.

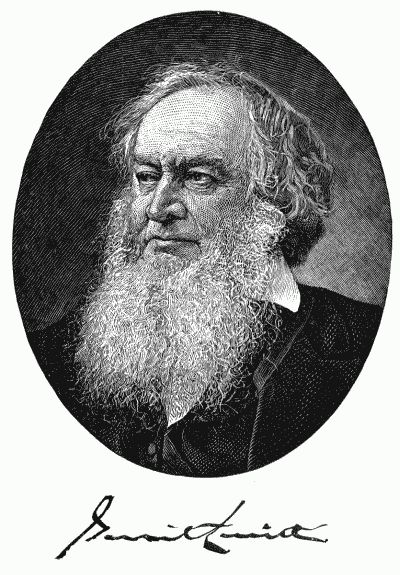
Gerrit Smith

Smith, along with his friend and ally Lysander Spooner, was a leading advocate of the United States Constitution as an antislavery document, as opposed to abolitionist William Lloyd Garrison, who believed it was to be condemned as a pro-slavery document, and was in favor of secession by the North. In 1852, Smith was elected to the United States House of Representatives as a Free-Soiler. In his address, he declared that all men have an equal right to the soil; that wars are brutal and unnecessary; that slavery could be sanctioned by no constitution, state or federal; that free trade is essential to human brotherhood; that women should have full political rights; that the Federal government and the states should prohibit the liquor traffic within their respective jurisdictions; and that government officers, so far as practicable, should be elected by direct vote of the people. Horace Greeley attributed to Smith the view that the state "has no other legitimate business than to keep one man's fingers off another man's throat and out of any pocket but his own." Unhappy with his separation from his home and business, Smith resigned his seat at the end of the first session, ostensibly to allow voters sufficient time to select his successor.

In 1869, Smith served as a delegate to the founding convention of the Prohibition Party. During the 1872 presidential election Smith was considered for the Prohibition Party's presidential nomination.

== Support for Black people ==
According to Black Rev. Henry Highland Garnet, who moved there at Smith's invitation, "There are yet two places where slave holders cannot come—Heaven and Peterboro."

=== Black landownership and voting initiative ===
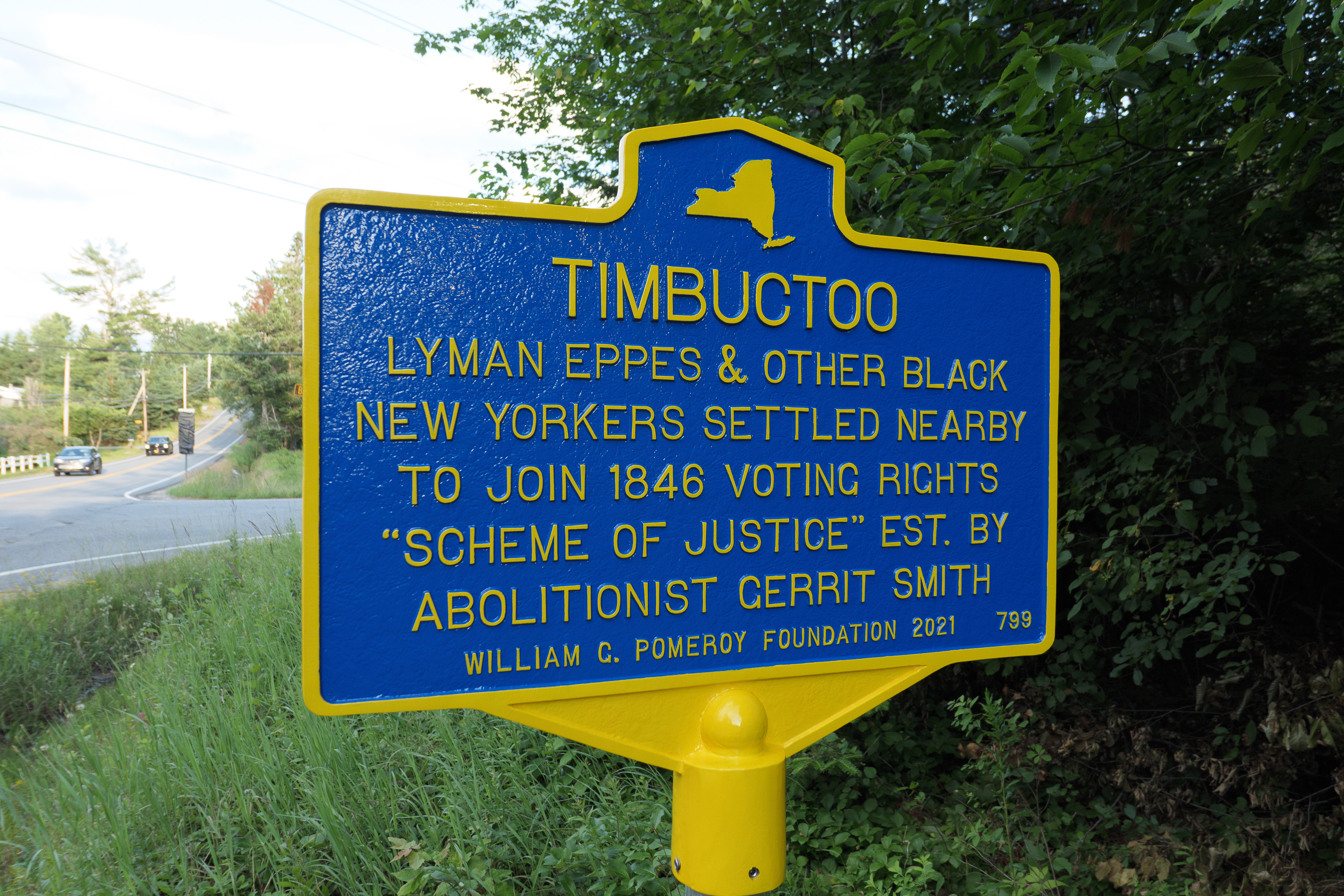
A historical marker notes the approximate location of the Timbuctoo settlement.

In 1846, a referendum failed to repeal the requirement from the Constitution of 1821 that black men had to own land worth at least $250 to be able to vote. After becoming an opponent of land monopoly and hoping to help black families become self-sufficient, Smith attempted to help free blacks settle approximately 120,000 acres (49,000 ha) of land he owned in the remote Adirondacks. He also aimed to isolate and thus protect them from escaped slave-hunters and to provide them with the property ownership that was needed for Blacks to vote in New York. Smith gave numerous farms of 40-50 acres (16-20 ha) each to 1,000 "worthy" New York state Blacks. The initiative created several projects to establish communities, including Timbuctoo, Florence (Florence Farming Association), and Blacksville.

Abolitionist John Brown joined the Timbuctoo project, purchasing land and moving his family there. However, the land Smith gave away was "of but moderate fertility", "heavily timbered, and in no respect remarkably inviting". In Smith's own words, it was his "poorest land"; his better land he sold. Most grantees never saw the remote land Smith had given them; many of those who did visit it soon left, and in 1857, it was estimated that less than 10% of the grantees were actually living on their land. The difficulty of farming in the mountains, coupled with the settlers' lack of experience in housebuilding and farming and the bigotry of white neighbors, caused the project to fail. As Smith put it, "I was perhaps a better land-reformer in theory than in practice." The John Brown Farm State Historic Site is all that remains of the settlement, called Timbuctoo, New York.

=== The Chaplin slave escape ===
Peterboro became a station on the Underground Railroad. Due to his connections with it, Smith financially supported a planned mass slave escape in Washington, D.C., in April 1848, organized by William L. Chaplin, another abolitionist, as well as numerous members of the city's large free black community. The Pearl incident attracted widespread national attention after the 77 slaves were intercepted and captured about two days after they sailed from the capital.

=== The Fugitive Slave Convention ===
The Fugitive Slave Convention was held in Cazenovia, New York, on August 21 and 22, 1850. It was a fugitive slave meeting, the biggest ever held in the United States. Madison County, New York, was the abolition headquarters of the country, because of philanthropist and activist Gerrit Smith, who lived in neighboring Peterboro, New York, and called the meeting "in behalf of the New York State Vigilance Committee."

=== Defending Fugitive Slave Law violators ===
Smith paid the legal expenses of several persons charged with infractions of the Fugitive Slave Law of 1850.

=== Helping John Brown in Kansas ===
Smith became a leading figure in the Kansas Aid Movement, a campaign to raise money and show solidarity with anti-slavery immigrants to that territory. It was during this movement that he first met and financially supported John Brown.

=== Harpers Ferry ===
Smith was a member of what much later was called the Secret Six, an informal group of influential Northern abolitionists, who supported Brown in his efforts to capture the armory at Harpers Ferry, Virginia (since 1863, West Virginia), and start a slave revolt. After the failed raid on Harpers Ferry, Senator Jefferson Davis unsuccessfully attempted to have Smith accused, tried, and hanged along with Brown. Governor Wise suggested that Smith be brought to him, "by fair or foul means", but residents of Peterboro said publicly that they would use guns to protect him.

Upset by the raid, its outcome, and its aftermath, expecting to be indicted, Smith suffered a mental breakdown; he was described in the press as "a raving lunatic", who became "very violent". For several weeks he was confined to the Utica Psychiatric Center, at the time called the State Lunatic Asylum. He was accused of feigning his illness, but multiple reports state that it was genuine. He was initially on a suicide watch.

When the Chicago Tribune later claimed Smith had full knowledge of Brown's plan at Harper's Ferry, Smith sued the paper for libel, claiming that he lacked any such knowledge and thought only that Brown wanted guns so that slaves who ran away to join him might defend themselves against attackers. Smith's claim was countered by the Tribune, which produced an affidavit, signed by Brown's son, swearing that Smith had full knowledge of all the particulars of the plan, including the plan to instigate a slave uprising. In writing later of these events, Smith said, "That affair excited and shocked me, and a few weeks after I was taken to a lunatic asylum. From that day to this I have had but a hazy view of dear John Brown's great work. Indeed, some of my impressions of it have, as others have told me, been quite erroneous and even wild." Ralph Harlow concluded his examination of the episode with this quote from Brown: "G S he knew to be a timid man".

While in the New York Lunatic Asylum, now the Utica Psychiatric Center, he was treated with cannabis and morphine.

=== Other social activism ===
Smith was a major benefactor of New-York Central College, a co-educational and racially integrated college in Cortland County.

Smith supported the American Civil War, but at its close he advocated a mild policy toward the late Confederate states, declaring that part of the guilt of slavery lay upon the North. In 1867, Smith, together with Horace Greeley and Cornelius Vanderbilt, helped to underwrite the $100,000 (~$1.89 million in 2025) bond needed to free Jefferson Davis, who had, at that time, been imprisoned for nearly two years without being charged with any crime. In doing this, Smith incurred the resentment of Northern Radical Republican leaders.

Smith's passions extended to religion as well as politics. Believing that sectarianism was sinful, he separated from the Presbyterian Church in 1843. He was one of the founders of the Church at Peterboro, a non-denominational institution open to all non-slave-owning Christians.

His private benefactions were substantial; of his gifts he kept no record, but their value is said to have exceeded $8,000,000. Though a man of great wealth, his life was one of marked simplicity. He died in 1874 while visiting relatives in New York City.

The Gerrit Smith Estate, in Peterboro, New York, was declared a National Historic Landmark in 2001.

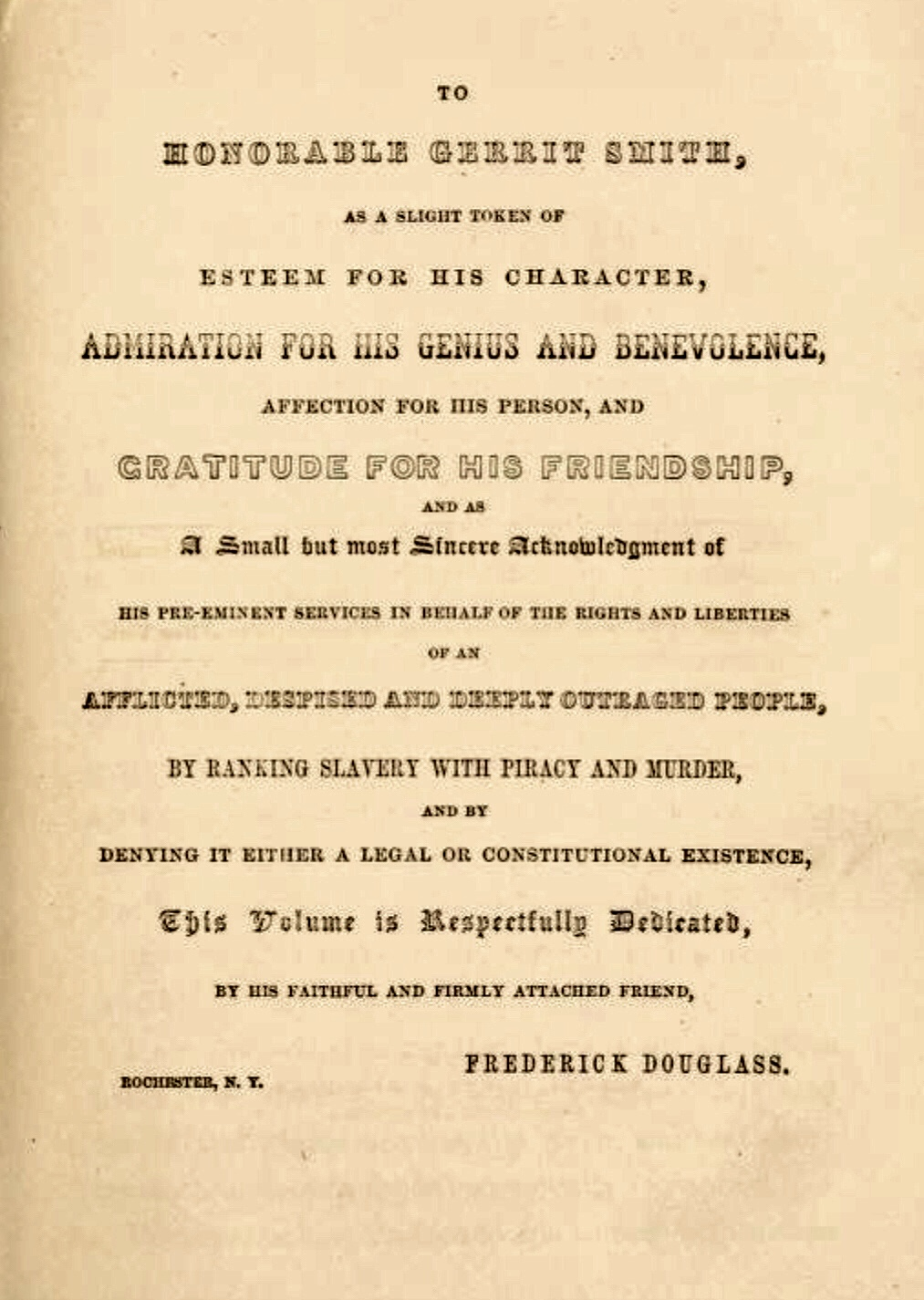
Dedication page of Frederick Douglass, My Bondage and My Freedom, 1855

== Tribute ==
Frederick Douglass dedicated to Smith My Bondage and My Freedom (1855):

To honorable Gerrit Smith, as a slight token of esteem for his character, admiration for his genius and benevolence, affection for his person, and gratitude for his friendship, and as a small but most sincere acknowledgement of his pre-eminent services in [sic] behalf of the rights and liberties of an afflicted, despised and deeply outraged people, by ranking slavery with piracy and murder, and by denying it either a legal or Constitutional existence, this volume is respectively dedicated, by his faithful and firmly attached friend, Frederick Douglass.

Years before, a student at his Peterboro Manual Labor School, where "Mr. Smith liberally supplies us with stationery, books, board and lodging", stated that "if the man of color has a sincere friend, that friend is Gerrit Smith".

A visitor to Smith's house in 1870 described it as follows:

I have visited many houses...but never before one like this. One breathing the affluence of wealth without a touch of its insolence, characterized by refinement and the highest culture, yet free from all the impertinance of display. Plainness of attire, simplicity of manner, absolute sincerity, and an all-pervading spirit of love characterize the family and give tone to the home—a home free from press and hurry and confusion, where differences of opinion are expressed without irritation, where the individual is respected, where the younger members of the family are reverent and the older ones considerate, where all are mindful of the interests of each, and each is thoughtful for all.

== Philanthropic activities ==
Money was for Smith a resource that belonged to others, a divine gift to be used for the common good. Smith provided support for a large number of progressive causes and people and, except for his land grants, did not keep careful records. The dates given are in some cases approximate, either because documents do not provide a definite date, or because there were multiple payments.

- "200,000 acres (81,000 ha) of his land he had divided among various destitute people, and 650 poor women have received money from him to help provide themselves with homes."
- Built and ran unsuccessful temperance hotel on his property in Peterboro, 1827–1833. It reopened in 1845 but was no more successful. He also established an unsuccessful temperance hotel in Oswego.
- Supporter of American Colonization Society, 1820s–early 1830s.
- Support for the Oneida Institute, the first school at which both Blacks and whites were welcomed, 1830s.
- Manual labor school for "colored boys" in Peterboro, 1834–1836 (two years). Benjamin Quarles suggests that Smith may have ended the project because it was duplicating what was available at the nearby Oneida Institute, headed by his friend Beriah Green. Another scholar suggests that the school closed because of Smith's disillusionment with the American Colonization Society, as the school had set upon preparing students to Christianize Africa.
- Created in Peterboro a group home to support economically destitute children.
- Founder of nondenominational Free Church of Peterboro, 1843. (Dissatisfied with existing churches' refusal to insist on abolition.)
- Supported Frederick Douglass' abolitionist newspaper, The North Star, late 1840s. Douglas dedicated the second of his autobiographies to Gerrit.
- Supported planned mass slave escape in Washington, DC, in April 1848, organized by William L. Chaplin.
- Provided land in North Elba, New York, to support Timbuctoo settlement of Black farmers, 1848.
- Sold land in North Elba to John Brown "for a bargain price of $1 an acre".
- Major benefactor of New-York Central College, 1850s.
- Helped with legal expenses of Fugitive Slave Law violators, 1850s. Primary sponsor of the Fugitive Slave Convention, held in neighboring Cazenovia.
- In 1851, he funded the establishment of an educational academy in Peterboro.
- About 1855, gave $25,000 (equivalent to $863,839 in 2025) to build the Oswego City Library, and $5,000 for books.
- Leading figure in the New England Emigrant Aid Society (Kansas Aid Movement), assisting abolitionist settlers and John Brown working to make Kansas a free state, 1850s.
- Between 1856 and 1874, donated money to "interracial colleges": Berea College, Hampton Agricultural Institute, Dartmouth College, and Howard University.
- Paid for printing of James Redpath's The Roving Editor: or, Talks with Slaves in the Southern States, 1859.
- One of Secret Six that helped finance John Brown's raid on Harper's Ferry, 1859
- With Horace Greeley and Cornelius Vanderbilt, one of guarantors of Jefferson Davis's bond, 1867.
- Supported William G. Allen and family financially during their poverty in London, 1870s and 1880s.

After his death, a newspaper reported his philanthropic activities as follows:

His private benefactions were boundless. He literally gave away fortunes to relieve immediate distress. Old men and women asked for sustenance in their infirmity. To redeem farms, to buy unproductive land, to send children to school, applications were made from every part of the country.
But permanent institutions, too, bear witness to the solid character of his bounty. The public subscription papers of his times usually bore his name at the head and for the largest sum. There were $5,000 to a single war fund. The English destitute received at one time $1,000, the Poles $1,000, the Greeks as much more. The sufferers by a fire at Canastota received the next morning $1,000. The sufferers by the Irish famine were gladdened by a gift of $2,000. A thousand went to the sufferers from the grasshoppers in Kansas and Nebraska. The Cuban subscriptions took $5,000. Individuals in distress, anti-slavery men, temperance reformers, teachers, hard-working ministers of whatever denomination, received sums all the way from $500 to $50. In cases when money was required to vindicate a principle—as in the Chaplin case—thousands of dollars were contributed, To keep slavery out of Kansas cost him $18,000. He helped on election expenses, maintained papers, supported editors and their families, was at perpetual charge for the maintenance of societies organised for particular reforms. The free library at Oswego, an admirable institution, comprising about six thousand wisely selected volumes, with less trash than any public collection of books we ever saw, owes its existence to his endowment of $30,000 (~$914,752 in 2025) in 1853. Judicious management, seconded by the liberality of the city, makes this library minister to the higher intellectual culture. His own college, Hamilton, received $20,000; Oneida Institute thousands at a time; Oberlin, a pet with him on account of its freedom from race and sex prejudice, was endowed with land as well as aided by money. The New York Central College appealed to him, not in vain. The Normal School at Hampton obtained in response to an appeal in 1874 $2,000 (~$51,284 in 2025). Reading rooms, libraries, academies of all degrees drew resources from him. Seminaries in Virginia, Tennessee, Georgia, Vermont, tasted his bounty. General R. E. Lee's Washington College was as welcome as any to what he had to bestow. Berea College in Kentucky, received in 1874 $4,720 (~$121,031 in 2025). Storer College, at Harper's Ferry, received the same year two donations each of a thousand dollars. Fisk University, at Nashville, the Howard University at Washington, drew handsomely from his stores. He at one period, shortly before the establishment of Cornell University, projected a great university for the State of New York, for the highest education of men and women, white and black, and would have carried his plan into execution but for the difficulty of procuring the superintendent he wanted. His donation of $10,000 to the Colonization Society because he had pledged it, though when he paid the money he had satisfied himself that the society was not what he had been led to believe—was considered by many abolitionists a proceeding the chivalrous honor whereof hardly excused the indiscreet support given to what he now regarded as a fraud. His charges for the rescue and maintenance of fugitive[s] from southern slavery were very heavy; in one year they amounted to $5,000. To meet the incessant casual calls that were made on him, it was a custom to have checks prepared and only requiring to be signed and filled in with the applicant's name, for various amounts. No call of peculiar necessity escaped his attention, and his bounty was as delicate as it was generous. Whole households looked to him as their preserver and constant benefactor. A unique example of his benevolence was his donation, through committees, of a generous sum of money, as much as $30,000, to destitute old maids and widows in every county of the State. The individual gift was not great, $50 to each, but the total was considerable; the humanity expressed in the idea is chiefly worth considering.

== Honors ==
In 2005 Smith was inducted into the National Abolition Hall of Fame, in Peterboro, New York.

== Writings ==
Smith paid for the printing of hundreds of broadsides, with his views on a variety of subjects. His own collection of his pamphlets is in the Syracuse University Library. A number of recipients bound those they received into volumes, different contents for each collector.

- Smith, Gerrit (1922) [March 23, 1829]. "Letter to Andrew Yates". Documentary History of Hamilton College. Clinton, New York: Hamilton College. pp. 201–208.
- Smith, Gerrit (1833). Letter from Gerit [sic] Smith, to Edward C. Delavan, esq. on the reformation of the intemperate. Albany, New York. OCLC 79910882.
- Smith, Gerrit (1835). "Speech of Mr. Gerrit Smith". Proceedings of the New York Anti-Slavery Convention : held at Utica, October 21, and New York Anti-Slavery State Society : held at Peterboro, October 22, 1835. pp. 18–23.
- Smith, Gerrit (1837). Letter of Gerrit Smith to Hon. Gulian C. Veplanck. [Calling on the New York Legislature to remove legal discrimination towards "our colored inhabitants".] Whitesboro, New York.
- Smith, Gerrit (1837). Letter of Gerrit Smith to Rev. James Smylie, of the state of Mississippi. New York: R.G. Williams, for the American Anti-Slavery Society.
- Liberty Party (N.Y.). State Convention (1842). Address of the Peterboro State Convention to the slaves, and its vindication. Cazenovia, New York. Probably written by Smith. Includes (pp. 16–23) an "Extract from a letter by Gerrit Smith to Rev. Wm. H. Brisbane".
- Smith, Gerrit (1844). Constitutional Argument against American Slavery. [In the form of a letter to John G. Whittier.] Utica, New York: Jackson & Chaplin.
- Smith, Gerrit (1846). Gerrit Smith's land auction. For sale, and the far greater share at public auction, about three quarters of a million of acres of land, lying in the State of New-York.
- Smith, Gerrit (1846). An address to the three thousand colored citizens of New-York : who are the owners of one hundred and twenty thousand acres of land, in the state of New-York, given to them by Gerrit Smith, Esq. of Peterboro, September 1, 1846. New York.
- Smith, Gerrit (1847). Abstract of the argument, in the public discussion of the question: "Are the Christians of a given community the church of such community?" made by Gerrit Smith, in Hamilton College, April 12th, 13th, 14th, 1847. Albany, New York.
- Smith, Gerrit (October 16, 1850) [October 7, 1850]. "Gerrit Smith's appeal, and the Fugitive Slave Law". Madison County Whig. Cazenovia, New York. p. 7 – via NYS Historic Newspapers.
- Smith, Gerrit (1851). The True Office of Civil Government. A Speech in the City of Troy. New York: S.W. Benedict.
- Smith, Gerrit (1852). Abstract of the argument on the fugitive slave law, made by Gerrit Smith, in Syracuse, June, 1852, on the trial of Henry W. Allen, U.S. deputy marshal, for kidnapping. Syracuse, New York: The Daily Journal.
- Smith, Gerrit (1853) [December 20, 1853]. Speech of Gerrit Smith, in Congress, on the reference of the President's message. [Smith's first speech on the floor of Congress. On the Koszta Affair.] Washington, D.C.
- Smith, Gerrit (1855). Speeches of Gerrit Smith in Congress [1853–1854]. New York: Mason Brothers.
- Smith, Gerrit; New York Tribune (1855). Controversy between New-York Tribune and Gerrit Smith. New York.
- Smith, Gerrit (July–August 1858). "Peace better than war : annual address delivered before the American Peace Society, in Boston, May 24th, 1858". The Advocate of Peace: 97–118.
- Smith, Gerrit (1859). Three discourses on the religion of reason. New York.
- Smith, Gerrit (1860). Gerrit Smith and the Vigilant Association of the City of New-York. [On slavery.] New York.
- Smith, Gerrit (1864). Speeches and letters of Gerrit Smith (from January, 1863, to January, 1864) on the rebellion. New York.
- Smith, Gerrit (1865). Sermon in Peterboro, May 21, 1865. The nation still unsaved, Only repentance can save it. Author not stated, but Library of Congress catalogued it as a work of Smith. There was no one else in Peterboro that could have written it. Peterboro? N.Y.
- Smith, Gerrit (1873). "Rescue Cuba Now" : Let crushed Cuba arise. Substance of the speech delivered in Syracuse, July 4, 1873. New York.

== Archival material ==
Smith's grandson, Gerrit Smith Miller, was the final resident of the Smith mansion. In 1928, before it burned, he donated Smith's enormous collection of letters, documents, diaries, and daybooks to the Syracuse University Library, along with a pamphlet and broadside collection of over 700 items. There is nothing like it for any other businessman of his day.

- Gerrit Smith Papers, Syracuse University Special Collections Research Center. 10,000 letters, 74 boxes. Library description of holdings: "Business, family and general correspondence; business and land records; writings; and maps. Notable correspondents include Susan B. Anthony, John Jacob Astor, Henry Ward Beecher, Antoinette Blackwell, Caleb Calkins, Lydia Maria Child, Cassius Clay, Alfred Conkling, Roscoe Conkling, Charles A. Dana, Paulina W. Davis, Edward C. Delavan, Frederick Douglass, Albert G. Finney, Sarah Grimké, Elizabeth Cady and Henry B. Stanton, Louis Tappan, Sojourner Truth, and Theodore Weld." The collection has been microfilmed, and together with materials of his father Peter Smith, fills 89 reels. A partial calendar of the general correspondence was published in 1941. The Special Collections Research Center of Syracuse University also holds Smith's pamphlet collection, "700+ items", which has also been microfilmed, and over half digitized and available online.
- Another important collection of documents related to Gerrit Smith is found in the archives of his alma mater, Hamilton College, in Clinton, Oneida County, New York.
- Additional documents are in the collections of the Peterboro and the Madison County Historical Societies.

== See also ==
- Gerrit Smith Estate
- Peterboro Land Office
- Peterboro, New York
- List of recipients of aid from Gerrit Smith
- National Abolition Hall of Fame and Museum
- Peterboro Area Museum
- Fugitive Slave Convention (Cazenovia, New York)

=== Relatives of Smith ===
- Ann Carroll Fitzhugh, wife
- Elizabeth Smith Miller, daughter
- Greene Smith, son
- Gerrit Smith Miller, grandson
- Gerrit Smith Miller Jr., great-grandson
- Elizabeth Cady Stanton, cousin

U.S. House of Representatives
Preceded by Henry Bennett	Member of the U.S. House of Representatives from New York's 22nd congressional district March 4, 1853 – August 7, 1854	Succeeded by Henry C. Goodwin
