= Oswego City Library =

- U.S. National Register of Historic Places
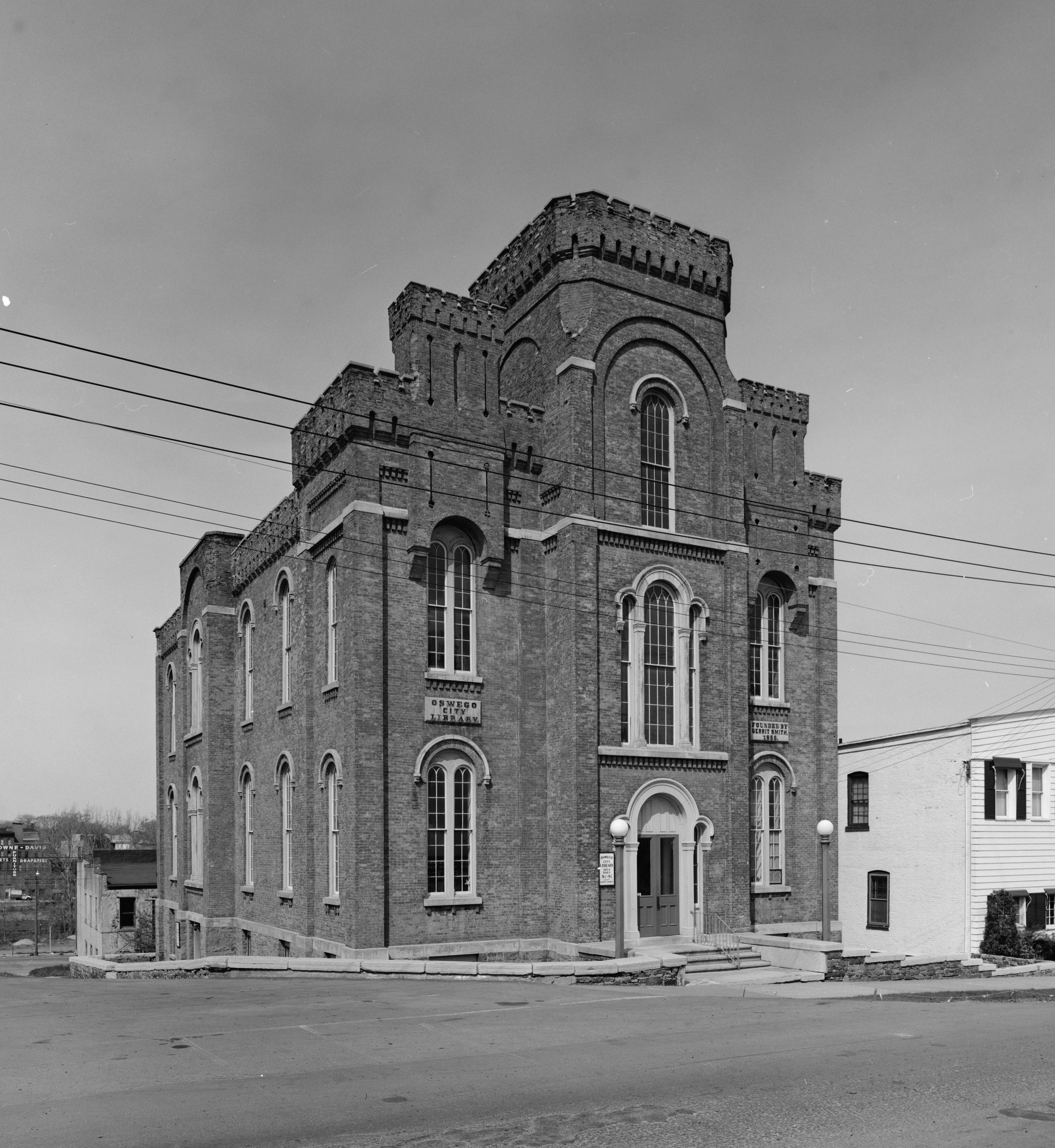
- Oswego City Library, 1966-1967

- Location within New York Location within the United States
- Location: 120 E. 2nd St., Oswego, New York
- Coordinates: 43°27′24″N 76°30′25″W
- Area: 0.3 acres (0.12 ha)
- Built: 1855
- Architect: Hewes & Rose
- Architectural style: Castellated
- NRHP reference No.: 71000554
- Added to NRHP: September 22, 1971

Oswego City Library is a historic library building in Oswego, New York. It has also been known as the Oswego School District Public Library. It was built in about 1855 and is a two-story brick structure over a full basement. It features a distinctive castellated style with exterior battlements, machicolations, tower, turrets, corbels, and arcaded windows. It was a gift from Gerrit Smith, who gave $25,000 for the building construction and $5,000 for books.

The library is credited for being the oldest public library in the United States that maintains operations out of its original building.

It was listed on the National Register of Historic Places in 1971.

== History ==
After a fire destroyed part of the library's building in 1853, politician and abolitionist Gerrit Smith gathered people to serve as Trustees to contribute to the maintenance of a new library which would value the welcoming of people of all backgrounds.

Smith stipulated that the library be located on the east side of the Oswego River, hence in the part of the city where he owned other properties, and also that "privileges and benefits of the library shall be always as acceptable to the one sex as the other, and that no person on account of their race, complexion or condition, shall be shut out of the privileges and benefits, or in any degree curtailed of them."

Upon opening to the public in 1857, the Oswego Public Library held approximately 8,000 volumes of works. The City of Oswego and the Oswego School System provided financial contributions to sustain the library in its infancy.

It is documented in early records that numerous black residents of Oswego, including Tudor E. Grant and his family, did indeed borrow books out of the library.

The library became part of an independent library district in 1999.

It was measured and documented by the Historic American Buildings Survey in 1966.
