= Secret Six =

Abolitionist conspiracy supporting John Brown

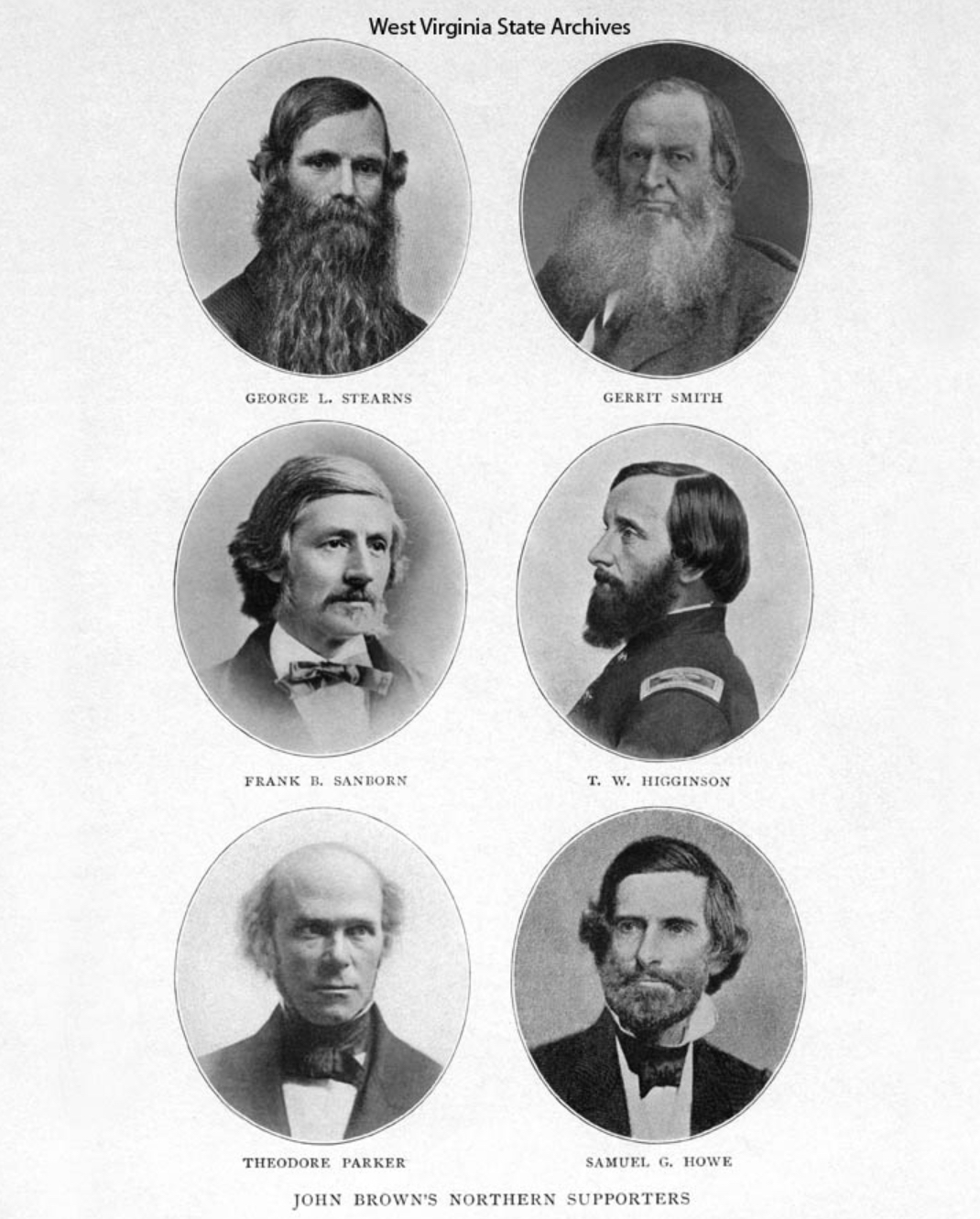
The Secret Six who helped John Brown

The so-called Secret Six, or the Secret Committee of Six, were a group of men who secretly funded the 1859 raid on Harper's Ferry by abolitionist John Brown. Sometimes described as "wealthy," this was true of only two. The other four were in positions of influence, and could, therefore, encourage others to contribute to "the cause."

The name "Secret Six" was invented by writers long after Brown's death. The term never appears in the testimony at Brown's trial, in James Redpath's The Public Life of Capt. John Brown (1859), or in the Memoirs of John Brown of Franklin Benjamin Sanborn (1878). The men involved helped Brown as individuals and did not work together or correspond with each other. They were never in the same room at the same time, and in some cases barely knew each other.

== Background ==
The Secret Six were Thomas Wentworth Higginson, Samuel Gridley Howe, Theodore Parker, Franklin Benjamin Sanborn, Gerrit Smith, and George Luther Stearns. All six had been involved in the abolitionist cause prior to their meeting John Brown, and had gradually become convinced that violence was necessary in order to end American slavery.

Of the six, only Smith and Stearns could be called wealthy. The others consisted of two Unitarian ministers (Parker and Higginson), a doctor (Howe) at a time when physicians were not well-to-do, and a teacher (Sanborn). Smith was one of the guarantors of a bail bond for Jefferson Davis after the Civil War.

To the extent the group had a leader, it was Brown biographer Sanborn. "Some of the money and nearly all the correspondence relating to the contributions passed through my hands in 1858–9. ...[W]e all raised money to aid Brown in carrying this plan forward."

== Involvement with John Brown ==
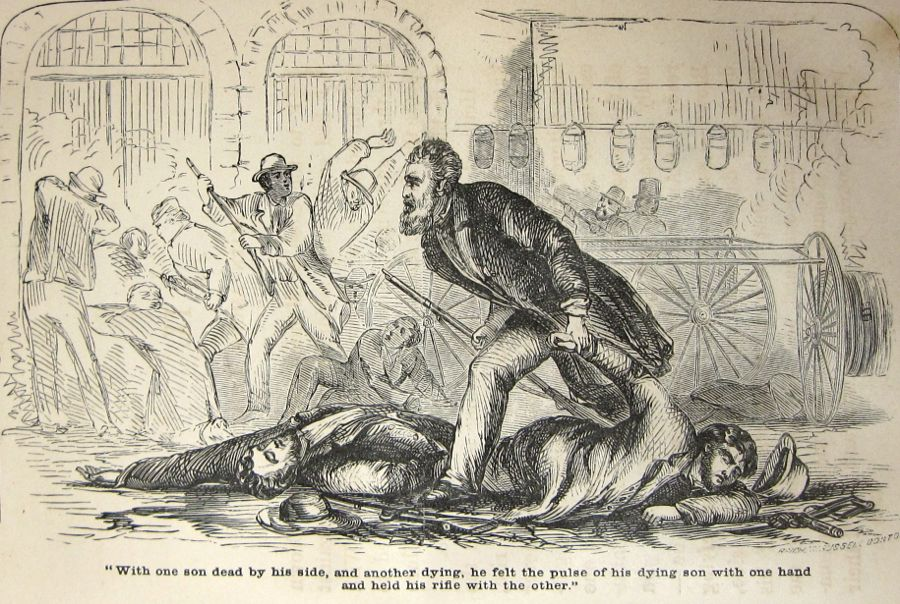
John Brown inside the engine house at the Harpers Ferry Armory, with two sons at his feet, one dead and the other dying.

Brown was planning to capture weapons from a federal armory at Harpers Ferry, Virginia (now West Virginia), and lead a slave rebellion in the South. While it is unclear whether these men knew of Brown's ultimate plan, it is known that some were ambivalent regarding the use of violence as a way to bring about the destruction of slavery. Brown met with members of the Six several times during 1858 and 1859 to discuss how he would attack the slave system.

In October 1859, Brown's plan failed. The question immediately arose of who was backing Brown, as his declarations that the raid was his own idea were not believed. Speculation and then testimony, reported in The New York Times, New-York Herald, and other papers, began to link the names of the Six with Brown's. On November 7, Smith had himself confined to an insane asylum, denying that he had been involved in supporting Brown. Howe, Sanborn, and Stearns fled to Canada temporarily to avoid arrest. Parker was already in Italy, a guest of Robert and Elizabeth Barrett Browning, as it was believed that a warm climate was helpful to those suffering from tuberculosis.

"We did not know that Brown meant to begin there, in Virginia, at Harper's Ferry," Sanborn insisted. Like Gerrit Smith, Sanborn felt justified in making public statements which told a part of the truth, but not the whole truth. "We expected he would go farther west, into a region less accessible, where his movements might escape notice for weeks, except as the alleged acts of some marauding party."

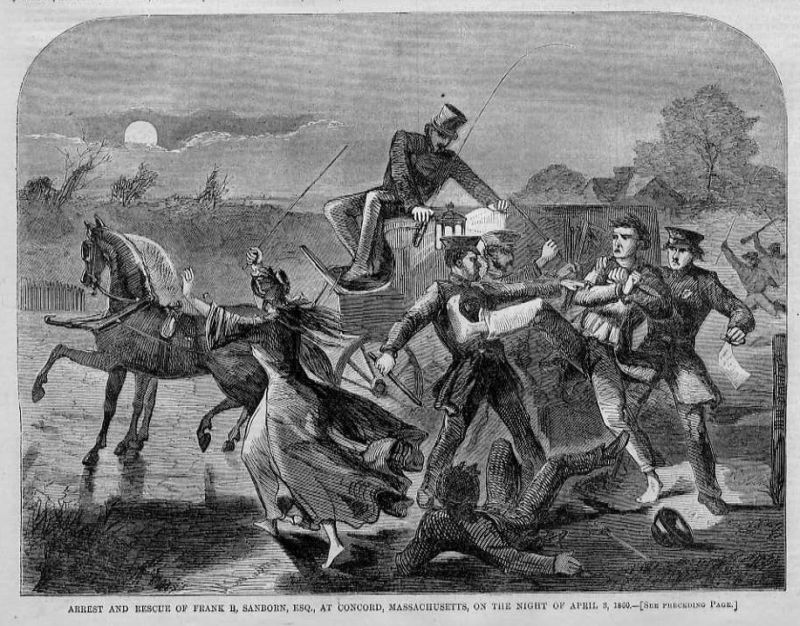
Frank Sanborn resists arrest by federal marshals

On the night of April 3, 1860, five federal marshals arrived at Frank Sanborn's home in Concord, Massachusetts, handcuffed him, and attempted to wrestle him into a coach and take him to Washington to answer questions before the Senate in regard to his involvement with John Brown. Approximately 150 townspeople rushed to Sanborn's defense. Judge Ebenezer R. Hoar issued a writ of replevin, formally demanding the surrender of the prisoner. In a letter to a friend, Louisa May Alcott wrote, "Sanborn was nearly kidnapped. Great ferment in town. Annie Whiting immortalized herself by getting into the kidnapper's carriage so that they could not put the long legged martyr in."

Parker, dying of tuberculosis, remained in Italy until his death in 1860. Higginson was the sole member of the Six to stay in the United States and to publicly proclaim his support for Brown. He even developed a plan to have Brown rescued from his jail cell, but Brown did not want to be rescued. Higginson asked Sanborn upon the latter's absconding to Canada, "Can your clear moral sense justify our holding our tongues in order to save ourselves from the reprobation of society, even as that nobler man whom we did provoke to enter into danger becomes the scapegoat of that reprobation, going for us even to the gallows?"

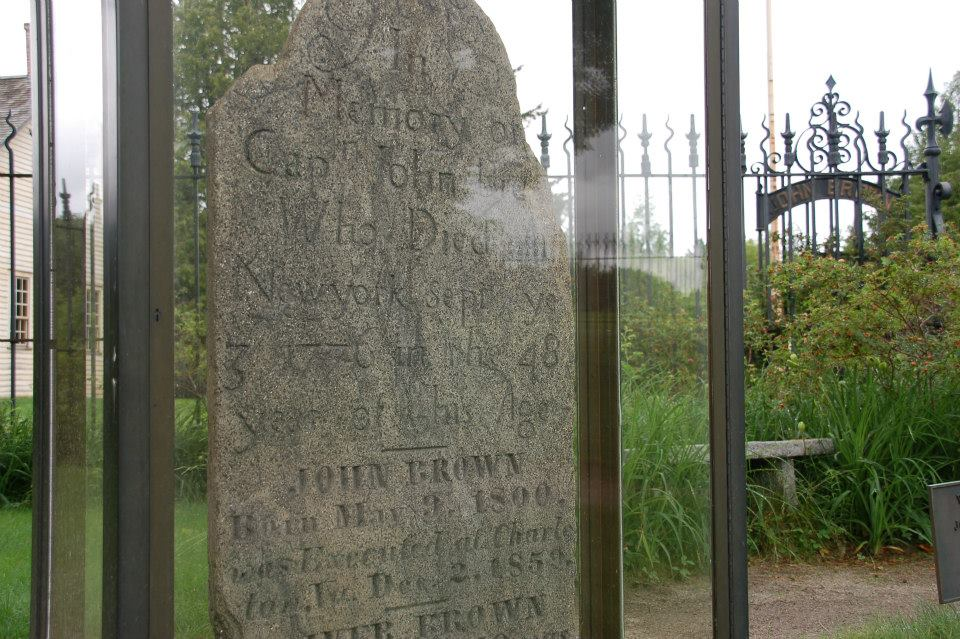
Higginson, Sanborn, and Sterns made periodic pilgrimages to the grave of John Brown in North Elba, New York, which has since been designated a New York State Historic Site. His tombstone is protected by glass.

== Aftermath ==
In January 1863, when the Emancipation Proclamation went into effect, a celebration, also called a "John Brown party", was held at the home of George Stearns, attended by Sam and Julia Ward Howe, Frank Sanborn, Ralph Waldo Emerson, Wendell Phillips, and John Murray Forbes. Higginson, who was busy commanding a regiment of black Union soldiers, sent his regrets. Gerrit Smith did not respond to Stearns' invitation. A marble bust of John Brown, created by sculptor Edwin Brackett, was unveiled at this time.

In 1867, Gerrit Smith helped post bail to release the imprisoned former Confederate President, Jefferson Davis. Smith's wife wrote to Sanborn in 1874, confirming that her husband had destroyed every one of his letters having anything to do with John Brown. Sanborn likewise combed through his own papers and letters, weeding out anything implicating himself or his partners in Brown's raid. Only some letters to Theodore Parker, which came back to Sanborn a year and more after his death, were not destroyed at this time.

For the remainder of their lives, Higginson, Sanborn, and Stearns made periodic pilgrimages to Brown's grave in North Elba, New York. Frank Sanborn saw to it that the daughters of John Brown received an education in Concord, and even after the turn of the twentieth century took a measure of responsibility for Brown's children and grandchildren.

Higginson expressed the wish that disunion could have been achieved "without the sacrifice of Brown" and believed a counter-proposal to the Harper's Ferry scheme should have been made—one that protected Brown from himself, believing the Six should have perceived "the madness that dwelled within him—the insanity that sat stealthily beside his great, selfless nobility."

In 1905, Higginson co-founded the Intercollegiate Socialist Society, along with attorney Clarence Darrow, Jack London, and Upton Sinclair.

After Sanborn's death in 1917, the House of Representatives of the Commonwealth of Massachusetts adopted a bill applauding him for his various life works, with special mention given to Sanborn's role as "confidential adviser to John Brown of Harper's Ferry, for whose sake he was ostracized, maltreated, and subjected to the indignity of false arrest, having been saved from deportation from Massachusetts only by mob violence."

== See also ==
- Origins of the American Civil War
- Mary Ellen Pleasant

== Further reading (most recent first) ==
- Faust, Drew Gilpin (December 2023). "The Men Who Started the War". The Atlantic: 82–89.
- The Significance of Being Frank: The Life and Times of Franklin Benjamin Sanborn, by Tom Foran Clark. (2009)
- The Secret Six: The True Tale of the Men Who Conspired With John Brown, by Edward Renehan. (1997) (ISBN 1-57003-181-9)
- Ambivalent Conspirators: John Brown, the Secret Six, and a Theory of Slave Violence, by Jeffery Rossbach. (1982)
- The Secret Six: John Brown and the Abolitionist Movement, by Otto J. Scott. (1979) (ISBN 0-8129-0777-9
