= Henry Ashby =

Henry Ashby may refer to:

- Henry Ashby (paediatrician) (1846–1908) in England
- Henry Marshall Ashby (1836–1868), Confederate States Army colonel
- Henry Ashby (footballer) (1875–1926), English football full back

== See also ==
- Harry Ashby (disambiguation)
- Henry Ashby Turner (1932–2008), American historian of Germany
