= Anna Maria Weems =

American woman known for escaping slavery

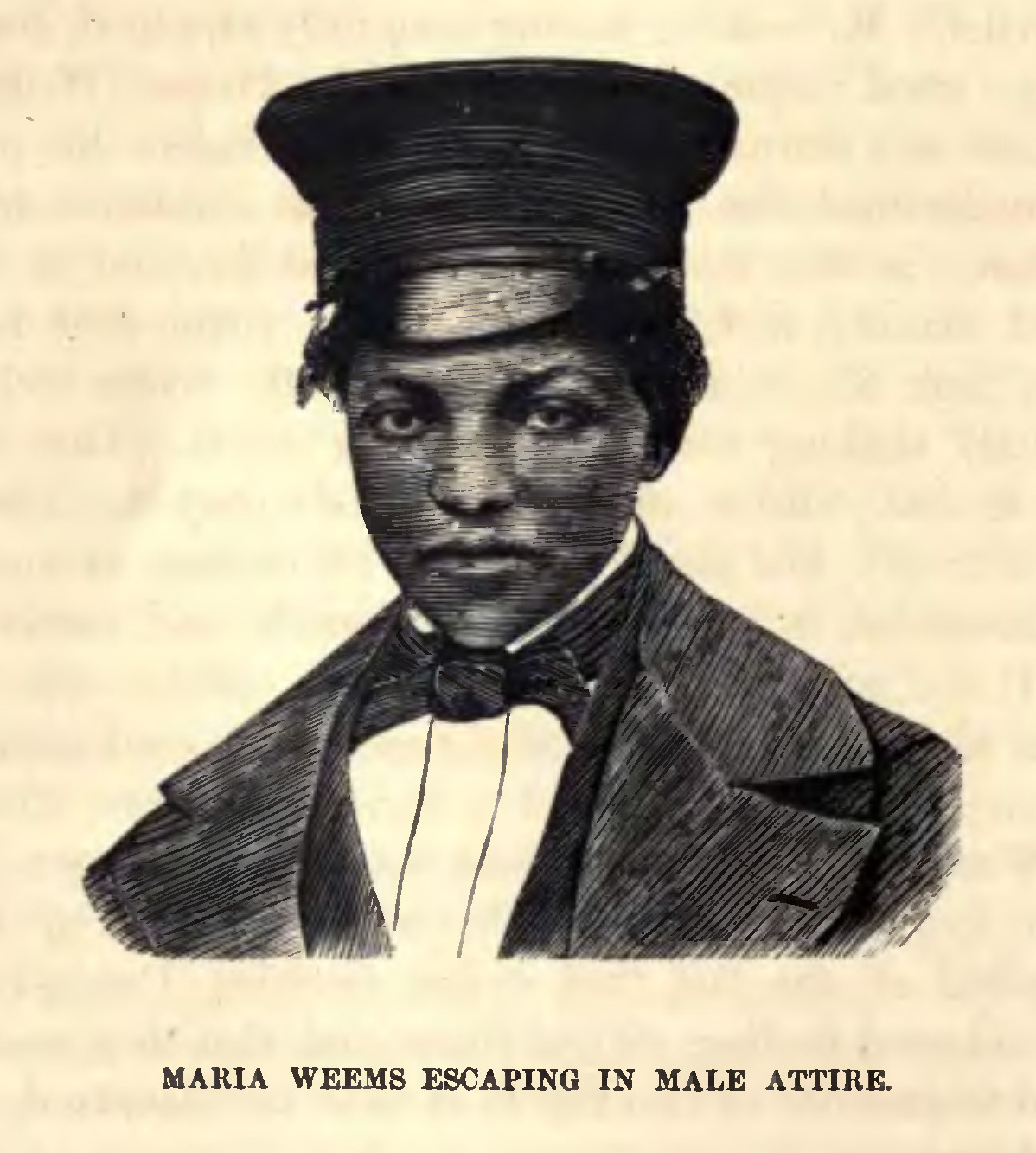
Photograph of Anna Maria Weems taken in November 1855 when she stayed at the home of Mrs. and Mr. William Still, a noted author of slave escape experiences and conductor on the Underground Railroad, of Philadelphia.

Anna Maria Weems, also Ann Maria Weems (ca. 1840 – after 1863), whose aliases included "Ellen Capron" and "Joe Wright," was an American woman known for escaping slavery by disguising herself as a male carriage driver and escaping to British North America, where her family was settled with other slave fugitives.

She and her younger sister were separated from her family at the age of seven, and her mother and brothers were sold in Alabama. Within a few months, her mother and two of her youngest brothers were manumitted and settled with their father in Washington, D.C. Then freedom for her sister, Catherine, was negotiated. The Weems had attained the money to pay ransoms through abolitionists in England and the United States, but were unable to purchase Anna Maria Weems' freedom. At age 15, she ran away from her slaveholder in Rockville, Maryland and traveled through Philadelphia, Washington, D.C., and Brooklyn, New York before arriving in Dresden, Canada West, British North America. The journey, made more treacherous due to the Fugitive Slave Act of 1850, occurred over two months, six weeks of which she was in hiding and most of which she was dressed as a young man.

Three books have been written about Weems and her family member's struggle for freedom, entitled A Shadow on the Household, Stealing Freedom and The Underground Railroad: Anna Maria Weems.

== Early life and pre-escape ==
Anna Maria Weems was born in Maryland around 1840 to John, a freeman, and Arabella Talbot Weems, an enslaved woman owned by Adam Robb. (Note: Arabella was also known as Earro, Airey, and Arrah.) Her mother was described as a woman of "superior culture and endowments". Arabella's mother, Cecelia Talbot, was also owned by Robb. They all lived in Montgomery County where Robb owned and operated a tavern and an inn.

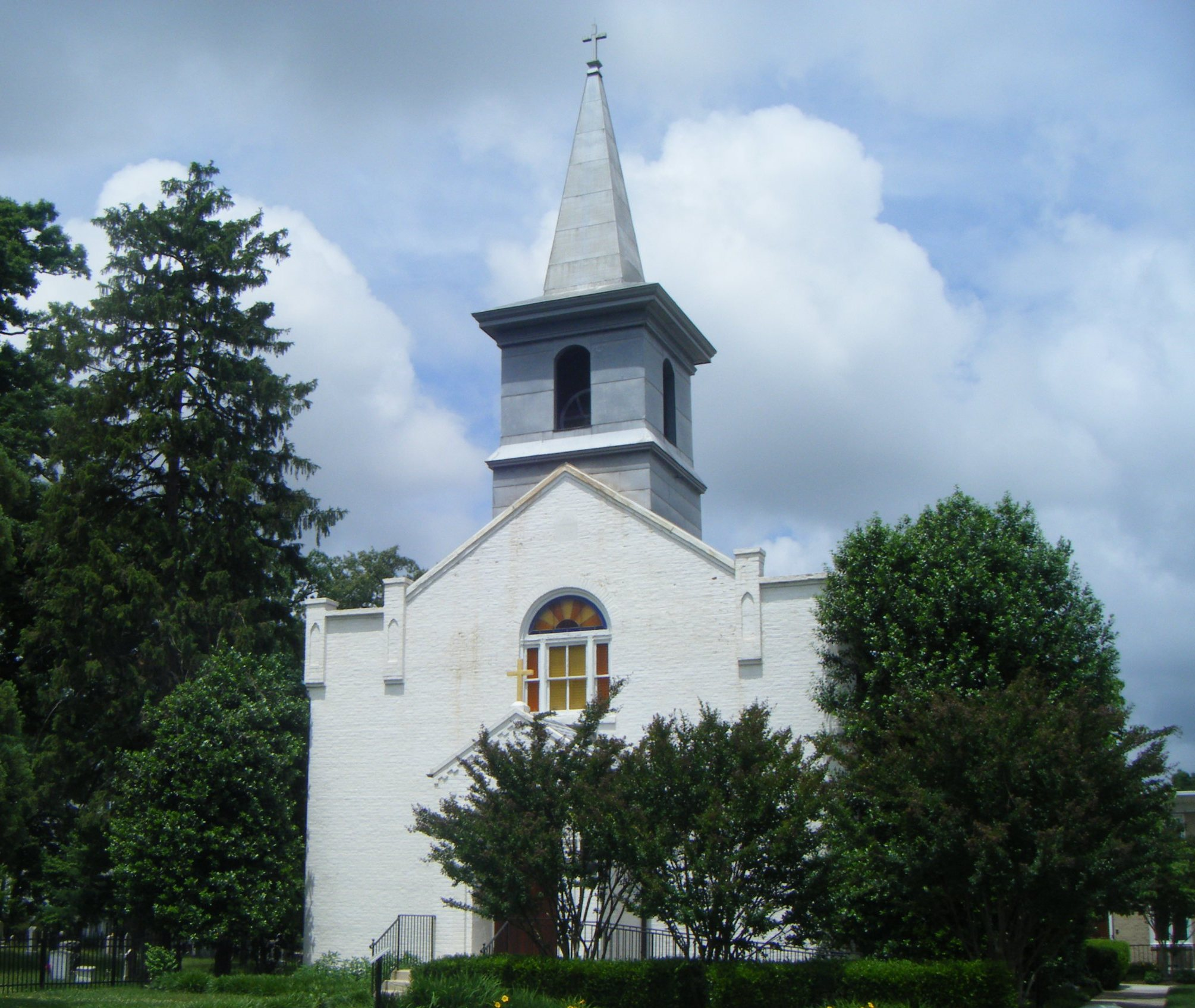
St. Mary's Catholic Church, Rockville, Maryland. Built in 1817, it was the first brick Catholic church in Montgomery County, Maryland.

Rare for an enslaved woman, Arabella married John on March 1, 1829, at the St. Mary's Roman Catholic Church in Rockville, Maryland. John, who worked on a small farm, purchased his freedom before their wedding and had Robb's promise that he could purchase his wife and children at "a reasonable price". (Note: Until he could do so, John made an agreement with Robbs that he would provide regular payments to him as long as he did not separate his family. John was unable to do much partly due to his slim wages, increased costs as they had more children, and anti-black laws of Maryland and neighboring Washington, D.C. which made life more precarious for free blacks, including conditions that allowed people to be returned to slavery.) Robb allowed the family to live together at times.

Over the course of their marriage, John and Arabella Weems had four daughters and six sons: Mary Jane (Stella), Catherine Ann, William Augustus, Thomas Richard (Dick), Charles Adam (Addison), Anna Maria, Joseph, John Lewis, Sylvester, and Mary. All of their children, except the youngest, Mary, were born into slavery. Arabella was a free woman when Mary was born. Anna Maria Weems was baptized at St. Mary's.

Robb died in 1847 when Weems was about five or seven years old. Robb's slaves were divided between his two daughters, Jane Robb Beall and Catherine Robb Harding. The latter daughter received Weems, her siblings and Weems' mother, but was deeply in debt, so she and her husband, Henry Harding, prepared to sell off slaves to salvage their financial situation. John tried to raise money to buy his family members, but was not able to do so before his family was divided. (Note: John had traveled to New York to find his eldest daughter, brother-in-law and sister-in-law to help arrange for the purchase of his family. He reached New York to find that they were not there; his in-laws had fled to Canada after the enactment of the Fugitive Slave Act of 1850 and his daughter was in England. He met with others who would ultimately help him reunite his family. When he returned to Maryland, though, he found that his wife and children were put into a slave pen in Washington, D.C. by a slave trader. John was told that if he wanted to purchase his family, it would cost $3,300 (equivalent to $24,187 in 2025). John made the acquaintance of Charles Bennett Ray during a return trip to New York. Ray sent word to Garnet in England of the fate of the Weems family with the expectation that he could and would raise funds in England to purchase the freedom of the family members.) Harding sold them to slave traders who placed two daughters in a slave pen and held Arabella and her sons in a Washington jail before they were sold and sent to Alabama in the Deep South. Weems and her sister Catherine were sold to Charles M. Price, a slave trader in Unity, Maryland. William Still described Charles Price as having been "given to 'intemperance,' to a very great extent, and gross 'profanity'" and added that his wife, Caroline, "is cross and peevish."

In 1849 or 1850, abolitionist William L. Chaplin helped their eldest daughter, Mary Jane, and Arabella's sister Annie and her family escape. (Note: Arabella's sister, Annie Talbot, married Abraham Young in 1847 at a Catholic church in Washington, D.C., and within a couple of years they had two children. Annie was owned by Adam Robb, and after he died she was valued at $450. Abraham was owned by another slaveholder.) Mary Jane went to Geneva, New York, where she was adopted by Henry Highland Garnet, a former slave and an abolitionist. The three subsequently changed their names. Mary Jane became Stella. Her aunt and uncle took the names Annie Bradley and William Henry Bradley. Stella moved with the Garnets to Jamaica in the West Indies in November 1852. In 1850, Arabella was pregnant with their ninth child. Around that time, their fourth child, Richard, appears to have died. (Note: Richard was identified as "infirm" on various records, and then no longer appears on records that included family members.)

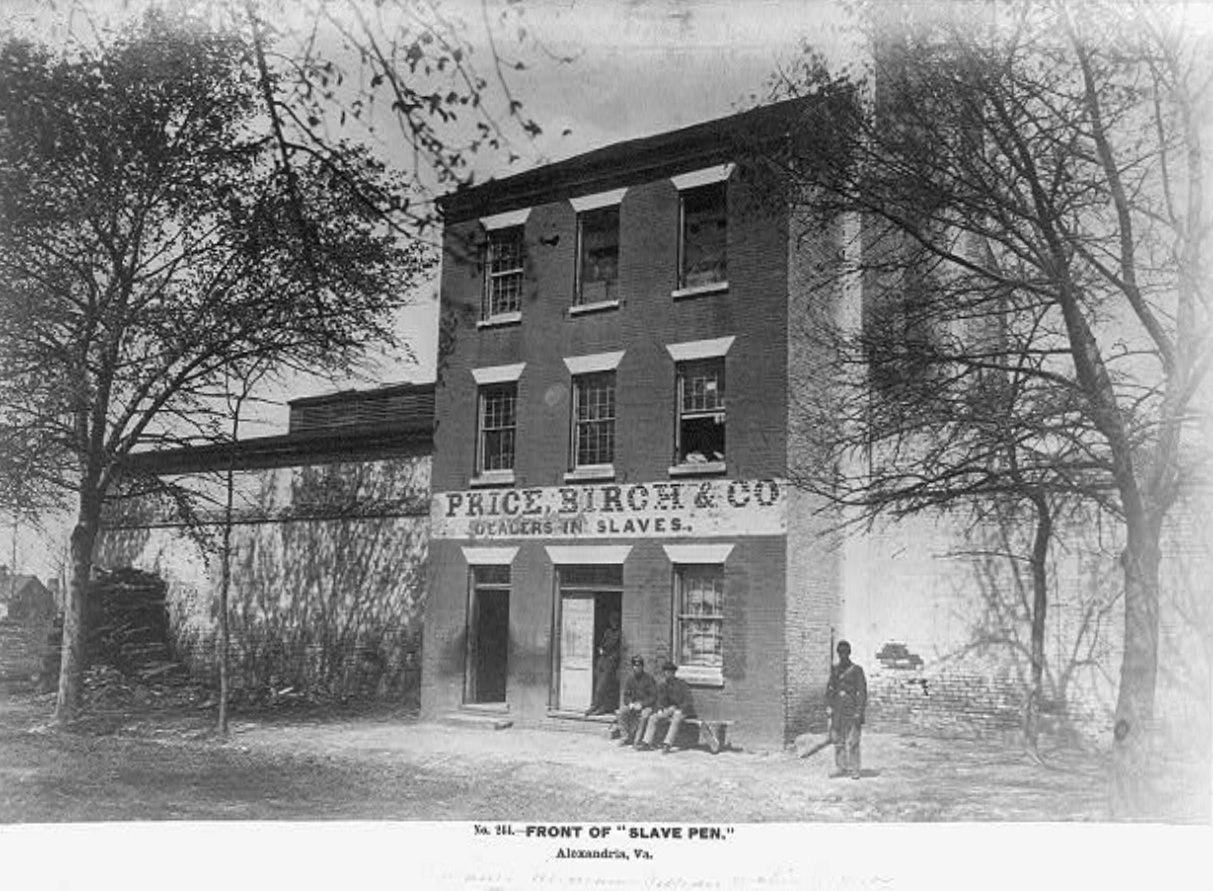
Price, Birch & Co. slave pen at Alexandria, Virginia. Taken during the Civil War (1861–1865). Library of Congress.

Having heard that the Weems family would likely be sold to different owners, the Weems Family Ransom Fund was created mostly from donations made by Henry and Anna Richardson, Quaker abolitionists from England. (Note: A pamphlet was published and circulated in Scotland in 1852 that told of the separation of the Weems family members. Henry Highland Garnet published a pamphlet that told of the Weems family struggles and separation. The New York Vigilance Committee for the Aid of Fugitive Slaves wrote to Garnett that they could assist in fund-raising and negotiation of the release of Weems family members. The fund, most of which came from the Richardsons, was controlled by the white abolitionist Lewis Tappan from Brooklyn and Charles Bennett Ray, a black abolitionist living in New York City.) with the objective to help John buy Arabella and their children's freedom. More than $5,000 was raised. Jacob Bigelow, a lawyer from Washington, D.C., negotiated to buy the freedom of Arabella (Note: Lewis Tappan was devoted to helping reunite the Weems family. He tried for years to find the missing children.) and two of the boys for $1,600 after a few months. John, Arabella, and the two boys settled in Washington, D.C. Their daughter Catherine was freed after paying a $1,000 or $1,600 ransom and she accepted a position in Washington, D.C. There was not enough remaining money in the fund for an offer that Price would accept to sell Anna Maria; for years, the Prices rejected any offers by Bigelow to sell Weems, getting up to $700 (equivalent to $24,187 in 2025) at one point. When she was 10 or 15 years old, Weems had to sleep in the Prices' bedroom to prevent her escape.

== Escape ==
For more than two years, Weems planned her escape from the Prices. Bigelow helped plan her escape with William Still, a conductor on the Underground Railroad and from the Philadelphia Vigilance Committee and Rev. Charles Bennett Ray of the New York Vigilance Committee. Conductors, like Still, aided fugitives in their travel between Underground Railroad stations, where they would get food and sleep before moving on to the next station. The trip would be very dangerous for her and those who helped her, even moreso after the passage of the Fugitive Slave Act of 1850, which meant staying in Washington with her family or other places in the United States was very dangerous. So the goal was to escort her to the settlement in Dresden, Ontario, Canada where her aunt and uncle found safety.

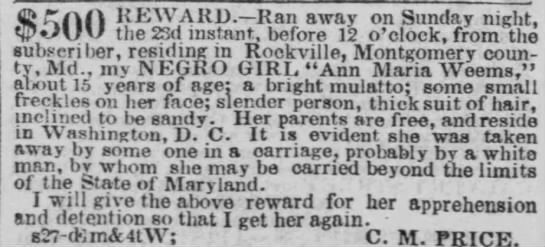
Newspaper ad by C.M. Price with a notice of a $500 ransom for the apprehension of Ann Maria Weems, The Baltimore Sun, Maryland

At the age of 15, Weems escaped the Price household (Note: She may have been helped by her cousins, an 18-year-old female and 23-year-old male.) in Rockville and embarked on a 15-mile journey to Washington, D.C., on September 23, 1855. (Note: It is also said that she escaped in October of that year, which was when an ad was placed for her apprehension. The ad clearly states that she left on September 23, 1855.) She may have stayed with family members in the city for a while before meeting up with Bigelow, who was an Underground Railroad conductor. An ad was posted in the newspaper about her escape and offered a $500 (equivalent to $17,277 in 2025) ransom. She was described as "A bright mulatoo, some small freckles on her face; slender person, thick suit of hair, inclined to be sandy".

Due to the amount of the ransom, Weems was sequestered in Bigelow's house for six weeks. They organized a plan to disguise Weems as "Mr. Joe Wright", a male carriage driver, in a driver's uniform, cap and a bow tie. She was also taught how to carry herself like a young man.

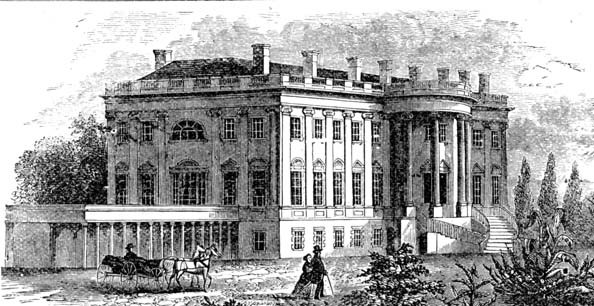
Mid 19th century engraving showing the White House at Washington, D.C. as seen from the southwest.

Bigelow's white physician, Dr. Ellwood Harvey ("Dr. H.") of the Woman's Medical College of Pennsylvania, helped her escape the city by driving his carriage to the White House, where he met up with Weems who had been escorted by Bigelow. Weems took the driver's seat and drove out of Washington, D.C. Along the way, they came upon both a toll gate operator and a ferry operator who questioned whether to provide them passage. They stopped along a several day leg of her journey, during which they stayed at Dr. H's friend's homes, who were slaveholders. He managed jokes that "Joe" might be a runaway and then claimed to have dizzy spells that required "Joe" to sleep in his room, which provided safety for Weems. On their second day, Harvey managed a disturbance by several men who tried to stop them after crossing the Susquehanna River. They made it to William Still's house in Pennsylvania on November 22, 1855, (Note: Still said that she arrived at their house on Thanksgiving, which was on November 22 in 1855. she was at William Still's house Harvey and Weems were also said to have arrived on November 25, 1855. In any event, she was said to have hidden in the safety of the attic with a plate of holiday food on Thanksgiving, while the family that she was staying with on that night entertained guests in the parlor, which may have been the Still's home on November 22 or the Tappan's house on or shortly after November 28.) where a photograph was taken of her in disguise for her mother. In his station report for the Underground Railroad, he described Weems: "She is about fifteen years of age, bright mulatto, well grown, smart, and good-looking."

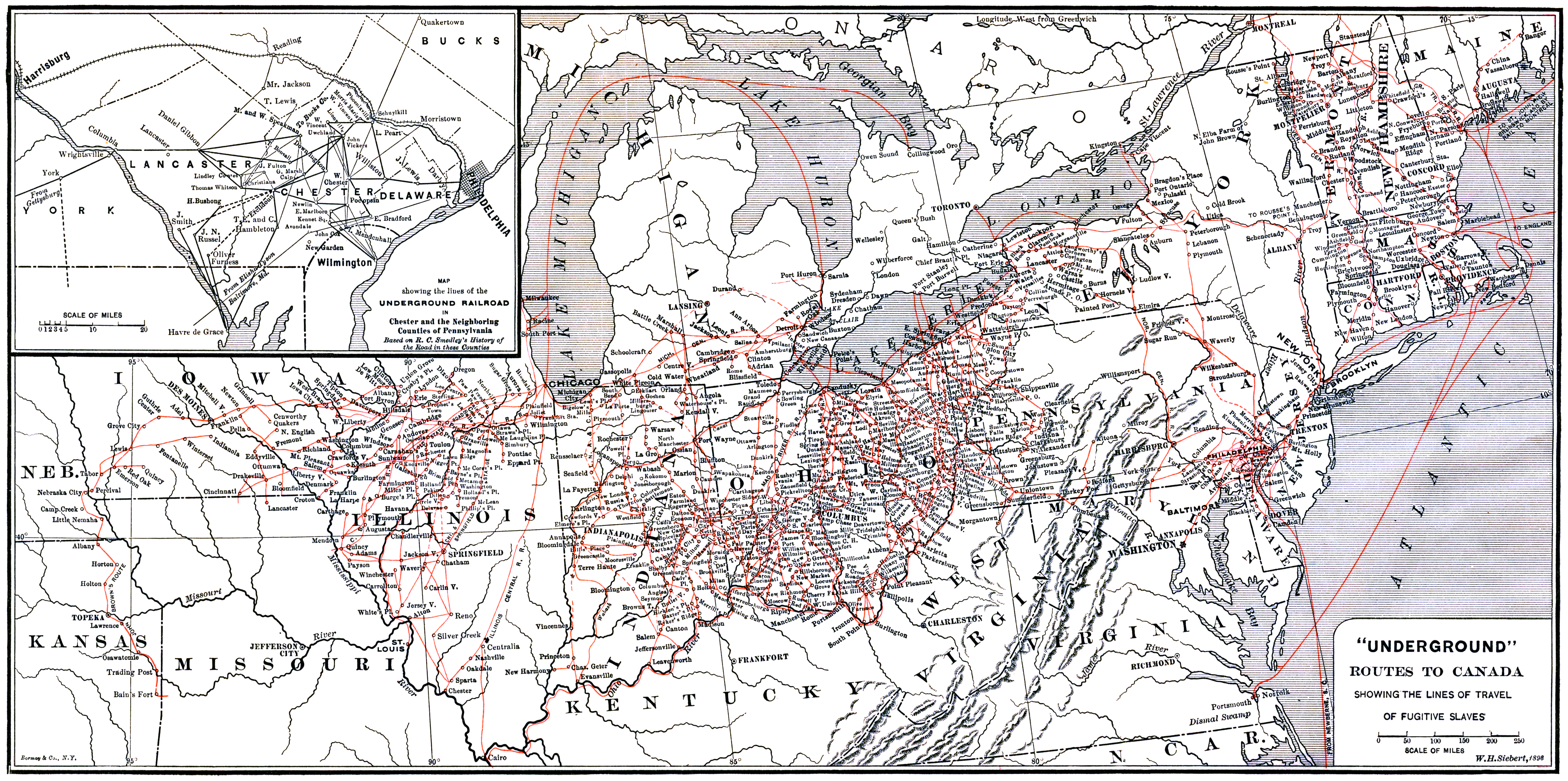
"Underground" routes to Canada, showing the lines of travel of fugitive slaves. Weems traveled from Rockville, Maryland to Washington, D.C. After waiting six weeks to ensure her safety from ransom hunters, she continued on to Brooklyn, New York and from there to Dresden, Ontario, Canada.

Weems stayed at the Still's house several days before she was then taken to New York. On November 28, she was escorted by Rev. Charles Bennett Ray to meet abolitionist Lewis Tappan and his wife, Sarah Tappan, in Brooklyn. She stayed for several days, during which Sarah purchased new clothes for her, using $63 (equivalent to $2,177 in 2025) from the Weems Ransom Fund. The clothes were appropriate for the Canadian weather.

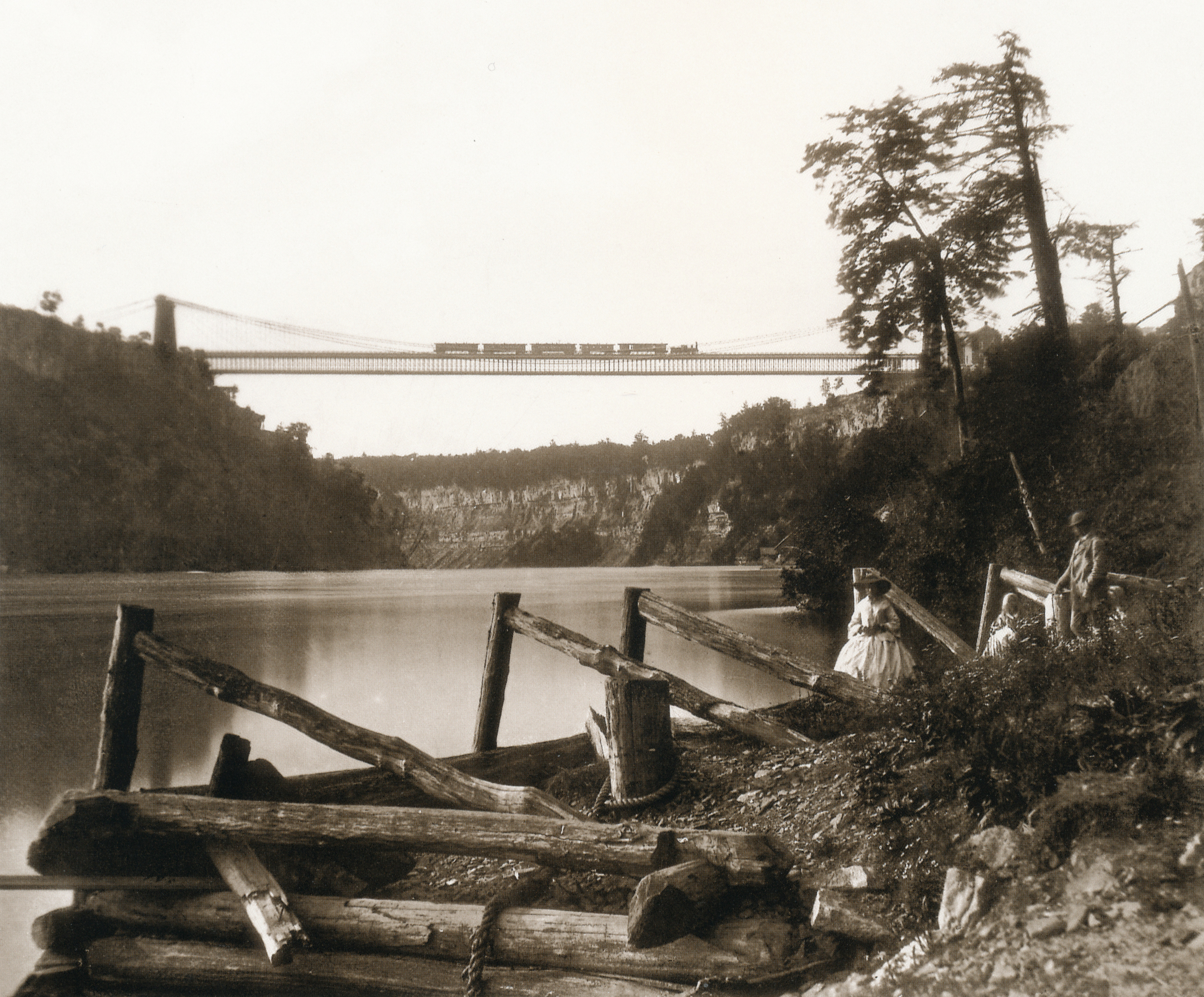
A locomotive crossing the Niagara Suspension Bridge over the Niagara River. Weems was safe after she crossed over the Niagara River into Canada.

She was then taken to the home of Rev. Amos N. Freeman, minister of the Siloam Presbyterian Church in Brooklyn. At the Freeman's house, "she received quite an ovation characteristic of the Underground Rail Road". Freeman took Weems to Canada by train, traveling through Rochester, New York and Niagara Falls. Once in Canada, they traveled by train to Chatham. From there, they were taken to by carriage (Note: They were also said to have traveled to Canada by a carriage, which occurred for parts of their journey, such as in and out of Washington, D.C. and Philadelphia, and in Canada from Chatham to Dresden.) to the Dawn settlement for former slaves in Dresden, Ontario, Canada where her aunt and uncle, William Henry and Ann Bradley, had escaped to as slaves. The Bradleys selected these new first names after gaining their freedom. (Note: The Dawn settlement (now the site of the Uncle Tom's Cabin Historic Site), was founded by the formerly enslaved Josiah Henson in 1830. Henson had been owned by Robb for a short period.) The journey ended in December 1855, two months after it began.

== Free life and death ==
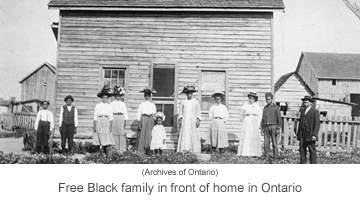
Free Black family in front of home in Ontario at one of the Canadian Settlements for former slaves

Under her aunt and uncle's leadership, she was educated at Buxton Mission at the Elgin Settlement (now Buxton National Historic Site and Museum), (Note: Also called the Buxton Settlement.) twelve miles south of Chatham, Ontario, which was one of four settlements established in Canada for black people.

The 9,000-acre settlement was located between Lake Erie and the Great Western Railway line. It provided education through the Buxton Mission School and religious services to its residents, most of whom had been enslaved. The land was divided into many 50-acre farms that could be paid for in installments over ten years. There was a brick-making plant, general store, grist mill, and a saw mill. The community grew to include a hotel, the Buxton post office, and a number of businesses. In 1856, there were 120 students who attended the mission school. The quality of the education afforded at the school is said to have made it "the most successful black settlement in North America." The local school for white children was closed and children transferred to the school at Buxton to improve their education. Students went on to enter politics, found the Freedmen's Hospital in Washington, D.C., and become teachers, doctors, and missionaries.

She settled at Buxton. John and Arabella had a daughter, Mary, who was born free about 1855. They were able to reunite with their other children; the remaining two sons, James and Addison, who were enslaved were bought with money from the Weems Family Ransom Fund by August 1858. (Note: Her mother, also known as Earro, wrote to Still on September 19, 1857 that she had "just sent for my son Augustus, in Alabama," who was the last family member in slavery. She inferred that she had engaged in fund raising after the fund was used up to be able to reunite her family: "I was not very successful in Syracuse. I collected only twelve dollars, and in Rochester only two dollars." She sent $1,100 (equivalent to $38,009 in 2025) to release her son.) Weems' mother said at the time in which her last child was freed, "I am expecting daily the return of Augustus, and may Heaven grant him a safe deliverance and smile propitiously upon you and all kind friends who have aided in his return to me." John and Arabella moved to the Dawn settlement in 1861 with their two youngest children, just before the start of the Civil War. They stayed there for nine years before returning to the District of Columbia, (Note: They were also said to have settled in Canada for the rest of their lives. Weems is also believed to have lived in Canada for the rest of her life.) where John, Arabella, their son John, and daughter Mary were living by June 1870.

== Significance ==
Historians such as Stanley Harrold have stated that the importance of gender is significant to the case of Weems, as her disguise is what allowed her escape to be successful. He also argues that this case also "suggests that a number of aspects of the underground railroad remain worthy of investigation" such as the international and interracial cooperation between abolitionists and that this would help historians understand why all persons involved continued to help regardless of the potential consequences of being caught.
