= Ackworth School =

School in Pontefract, West Yorkshire, England

- The school's Coat of Arms

Location
- Ackworth; Pontefract, West Yorkshire, WF7 7LT; England; 53.64875°N 1.33446°W

Information
- Motto: "Non sibi sed omnibus" (Not for oneself but for all)
- Religious affiliations: Religious Society of Friends (Quaker)
- Established: 1779; 247 years ago
- Department for Education URN: 108300 Tables
- Head: Martyn Beer
- Age: 2 to 18
- Enrolment: approx. 500 as of 2016
- Website: http://www.ackworthschool.com/

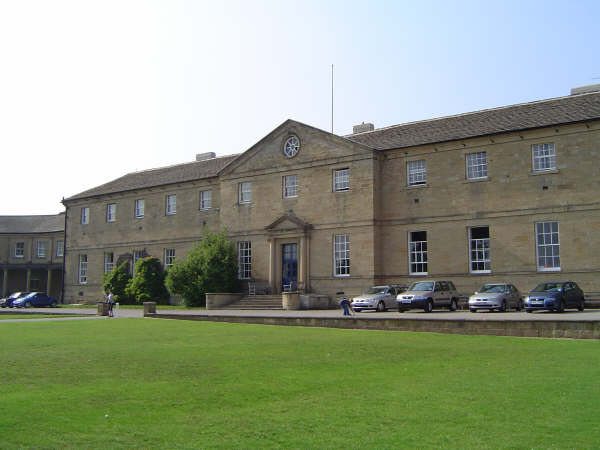
The School

Ackworth School is a private day and boarding school located in the village of High Ackworth, near Pontefract, West Yorkshire, England. It is one of seven Quaker schools in England. The school (or more accurately its Head) is a member of the Headmasters' and Headmistresses' Conference and SHMIS. The Head is Martyn Beer, who took over in April 2024.

The school has a nursery that takes children aged 2 1/2 to 4, a Junior School (known as Coram House) that takes children age 5 to 11, and the Senior School for students aged 11 to 18. The boarding facilities cater for pupils from 11 years of age.

Originally it was a boarding school for Quaker children. Today most of the school's pupils are day pupils. There are more than 25 different nationalities in the boarding houses.

Most of today's pupils are not Quakers, but the school retains a strong Quaker ethos and is able to offer means-tested Bursary awards to children from Quaker and non-Quaker families. There is a short Quaker-style silence at assembly and before meals. Once a week the School meets for a longer Meeting for Worship.

== History ==
The school was founded by John Fothergill and others in 1779 as a boarding school for Quaker boys and girls. Prior to the school's foundation, the buildings housed a foundling hospital created by Thomas Coram.

== School life ==
=== Houses ===
The school has four houses: Woolman, Gurney, Penn and Fothergill. Penn, Gurney and Woolman were all famous Quakers, and John Fothergill was the founder of the school. Every pupil is assigned to one of the four houses at the start of their time at the school for inter-house events, which include sport, music, drama, poetry and art.

Students are also divided for meals according to their houses.

=== Uniform ===
Navy crested blazer. Regulation pleated skirt or charcoal grey, tailored trousers. Long sleeve cotton revere collar chambray blouses or shirts. Senior tie - navy with royal stripe. Navy cotton acrylic V-neck jumper with royal stripe.

=== Music ===
The school has a strong musical tradition. In 1995, a purpose-built music facility was built on the site of one of the old boarding houses, comprising a recital hall with seating for 180, 14 practice rooms, 2 classrooms, a music library and a recording studio. Summer schools are sometimes held there during school holidays.

In January 2019, Ackworth School became the 15th member of the All-Steinway Group of Schools.

=== Boarding ===
Boarders live together in an amalgamated boarding house. Until 1997, the school timetable included Saturday morning lessons, leaving Wednesday afternoons free, providing a more-balanced week for boarders. The changing demographic of the school has led to this being phased out.

=== Sixth form ===
Sixth formers have free periods during which they are encouraged to study.

=== Charity week ===
Each year in the week before October half term is Ackworth's Charity Week. Two charities, one national and one international, are chosen for which the school then raises money through a series of events. Included within these events are cake stalls, auctions, concerts and the sale of doughnuts and hot dogs. One event involves putting sixth formers in stocks and allowing younger students to throw water at them.

One of the most-popular events of Charity Week is the staff/sixth-form entertainment. The sixth form and certain members of staff are encouraged to prepare a series of sketches to entertain younger students. In the middle of the event, a fund-raising activity occurs, where the sixth form raise money from the other students.

On 18 October the school celebrates Founder's Day, the day on which in 1779 the school was founded. The whole school gathers in the Meeting House and sings the Founder's Day Hymn before each year group departs on a day trip, usually a walk.

== Union with other Quaker schools ==
In 2007, the National Quaker Choral Festival was held at the school, where pupils from Quakers schools all over England came to sing in a large choir to Karl Jenkins' "The Armed Man".

On 28 March 2009, the Bridge Film Festival — which had been held at Brooklyn Friends School, located in Brooklyn, New York, for the last nine years — was held at the school. It is a Quaker film festival in which students make a film which is judged and prizes are awarded. The school entered the 2008 festival, sending several students to Brooklyn Friends School to witness the festival. For the 2009 festival, student Simon Waldock prepared a film about the history of the school; the film involved an interview with a former scholar from the 1950s. The film did not win but was commended by judges.

== Notable alumni ==
The school's former pupils are called Ackworth Old Scholars. There is an active Old Scholars Association, with an annual Easter gathering in the school. Notable Old Scholars include:

- Kweku Adoboli (born 1980), investment banker, convicted in the 2011 UBS rogue trader scandal
- Henry Ashby (1846–1908), paediatrician
- Henry Ashworth (1794–1880), cotton master
- John Gilbert Baker (1834–1920), botanist
- Geoffrey Barraclough (1908–1984), historian
- Tony Biggin (1963–1970), composer
- Sir Henry Binns (1837–1899), prime minister of Natal 1897–1899
- William Arthur Bone (1871–1938), chemist fuel technologist
- Henry Bowman Brady (1835–1891), naturalist and pharmacist
- John Bright (1811–1889), politician
- Basil Bunting (1900–1985), poet
- Peter Christopherson (1955–2010), musician, video director and designer
- Susanna Corder (1787–1864), educationist and Quaker biographer
- Ruth Conroy Dalton (born 1970), architect, author and professor of architecture
- Alfred Darbyshire (1839–1908), architect
- Philip J Day (born 1959), documentary filmmaker
- Henry Doubleday (1810–1902), starch manufacturer and comfrey cultivator
- William Farrer Ecroyd (1827–1915), worsted manufacturer and politician
- George Edmondson (1798–1863), headmaster of Queenwood Hall
- Thomas Edmondson (1792–1851), inventor of the first railway-ticket printing machine
- Sarah Stickney Ellis (1799–1872), writer and educationist
- Lindsey Fawcett (born 1979), actress known for her role in ITV's Bad Girls
- James Fearnley (born 1954), musician and member of The Pogues
- Arthur Charles Fox-Davies (1871–1928), heraldist
- Francis Frith (1822–1898), photographer
- Dominic Harrison (born 1997) musician (performing as Yungblud)
- Marie Hartley (1905–2006), artist, writer, photographer and historian
- William Howitt (1792–1879), writer
- Sir Philip Hunter (born 1939), educationist
- Sir Joseph Hutchinson (1902–1988), geneticist and professor of agriculture
- William Kekwick (1822–1872), an explorer in Australia
- Samuel Herbert Maw (1881–1952), architect, delineator and cartographer
- William Allen Miller (1817–1870), chemist
- John Howard Nodal (1831–1909), journalist and dialectologist
- Jacob Post (1774–1855), Quaker religious writer
- Sir James Reckitt (1833–1924), starch, blue and polish manufacturer
- Anna Richardson (1806–1892), philanthropist, abolitionist and pacifist
- Elizabeth Robson (1771–1843), Quaker minister
- Sanil Sachar (born 1992), Indian author and poet
- Jane Smeal (1801–1888), abolitionist
- Sir Arthur Snelling (1914–1996), diplomat
- Joseph Southall (1861–1944), painter and pacifist
- Patric Standford (1939–2014), musical composer
- Henry Tennant (1823–1910), general manager of the North Eastern Railway 1870–1891
- Kathleen Tillotson (1906–2001), literary scholar
- Thomas Thomasson (1808–1876), cotton master
- Samuel Tuke (1784–1857), philanthropist and asylum reformer
- Benjamin Barron Wiffen (1794–1867), biographer
- Jeremiah Holmes Wiffen (1792–1836), poet and translator
- James Willstrop (born 1983), squash player
- James Wilson (1805–1860), economist, founder of The Economist, politician, and financial member of the Council of India 1859–1860
- Rosie Winterton (born 1958), British politician, former Labour Chief Whip
- Fiona Wood (born 1958), burns-treatment pioneer, Australian of the Year
- Sarah Woodhead (born 1851), first (Girton College) woman to be awarded an Oxbridge degree – the equivalent of Senior Optime in Mathematics (1873)
- Jack Wolfe (born 1995), English actor, known for Hadestown, Next to Normal, and Shadow and Bone (TV series)
- Thomas William Worsdell (1838–1916), steam-locomotive engineer
- Wilson Worsdell (1850–1920), railway engineer

== Arms ==
Coat of arms of Ackworth School
Notes Granted 15 December 1959 Crest Issuant from a coronet composed of four roses Argent, barbed and seeded Proper, set upon a rim Or, a mount Vert, thereon a lamb statant, in the mouth a sprig of thyme, leaved and flowered, also Proper. Escutcheon Azure, on a chevron argent between three acorns slipped also Argent, a chevron Sable, thereon as many roses likewise Argent, barbed and seeded Proper. Motto Non Sibi Sed Omnibus

== See also ==
- List of Friends Schools
- Grade I listed buildings in West Yorkshire
- Listed buildings in Ackworth, West Yorkshire
