= Julia Williams (abolitionist) =

American abolitionist

Julia Ward Williams Garnet (July 1, 1811 - January 7, 1870) was an American abolitionist who was active in Massachusetts and New York.

Born free in Charleston, South Carolina, she moved with her family as a child to Boston, Massachusetts, and was educated in the North. A member of the Boston Female Anti-Slavery Society, she attended the Anti-Slavery Convention of American Women in New York in 1837. She married abolitionist Henry Highland Garnet and in 1852 they traveled to Jamaica to work as missionaries, where she headed an industrial school for girls. After the American Civil War, she worked with freedmen in Washington, D.C. to establish their new lives.

== Early life and education ==
Julia Ward Williams was born to free people of color in Charleston, South Carolina in 1811. Her family moved to Boston, Massachusetts, when she was a child. She had two younger sisters, Ann and Diana.

Williams was 21 years old when she traveled to Canterbury, Connecticut, to attend Prudence Crandall's Canterbury Female Boarding School, a school for "young Ladies and little Misses of color". After the school closed due to public violence, Williams went to the Noyes Academy in Canaan, New Hampshire. In 1835, it also had to close after violent opposition from local whites. Williams completed her education at the Oneida Institute in New York.

== Abolition campaigning ==
Williams became an outspoken advocate of abolition and African-American rights. Returning to Boston on a teaching appointment after her education, she became a member of the Boston Female Anti-Slavery Society (BFASS) during the 1830s. She was one of four delegates from the BFASS who attended the Anti-Slavery Convention of American Women in New York in 1837.

In 1841 Williams married Henry Highland Garnet, a teacher, minister, and prominent African-American leader of the abolitionist movement who was based in New York City. They had first met as students at the Noyes Academy; he also completed his education at the Oneida Institute. He wrote of her, 'O what [a] lovely being she is! Most susceptible and chaste. She seems to have everything which beautifys a female. A good Christian, and a scholar.' They had three children but only one, Mary Garnet Barboza, survived to adulthood.

While Garnet was pastor of the Presbyterian Church in Troy, New York, the pair welcomed people who had escaped from slavery into their church.

Julia supported her husband in his ministry, reading and advising on his speeches, running women’s literary associations, teaching Sunday School, and taking over the ministry while he traveled on speaking engagements.

Julia continued her campaigning for abolition in New York, working with the Female Benevolent Society of Troy, and running fundraising bazaars for the anti-slavery newspaper Impartial Citizen.

During the American Civil War, she founded The Ladies’ Committee for the Aid of Sick Soldiers, which supplied 60 soldiers with food.

In 1851, she travelled to London to chair the Free Labor Bazaar at the World Peace Congress.

== Mission trip and return ==
In 1852, the Garnet family traveled to the Caribbean island of Jamaica to work as missionaries. Julia headed a Female Industrial School. They returned to the United States after a few years because of her husband's health needs. They settled in Washington, DC, where he was minister of the Fifteenth Street Presbyterian Church. After the Civil War, Julia Garnet worked with freedmen in the capital. She died in their home in Allegheny City, Pennsylvania. on January 7, 1870 (aged 58)

== Support for former enslaved people ==
Anna Maria Weems lived in the Garnet household, joining them in their journey to Jamaica.

In 1858 she learned that her youngest sister Diana and Diana’s daughter Cornelia Read had been enslaved. After a fund-raising effort, Diana and Cornelia were redeemed from slavery by Julia’s brother-in-law, Rev. James Stafford. Cornelia went on to marry Civil War veteran William B. Gould.

== Legacy ==
In 2014 the Prudence Crandall Museum was preparing an exhibit interpreting the life of Williams, but the school site has undergone restoration and does not have exhibits as of 2022, only tours.

== Sources ==
- "Students at Prudence Randall's School for African-American Women 1833 – 1834", State of Connecticut – Connecticut Commission on Culture and Tourism
- Yellin, Jean Fagan; Van Horne, John C. The Abolitionist Sisterhood: Women's Political Culture in Antebellum America. Ithaca: Cornell University Press, 1994.
- Gold Hansen, Debra. Strained Sisterhood: Gender and Class in the Boston Female Anti-Slavery Society. Amherst: University of Massachusetts Press, 1993.
- Weston, Anne Warren, 1812–1890; Weston, Deborah, b.1814 recipient. [Letter to] My Dear Debora[h] [manuscript] (1837). Internet Archive. Call number: 39999063210411. Digitizing sponsor: Associates of the Boston Public Library / The Boston Foundation. Book contributor: Boston Public Library.
