= Robert Boot =

Robert Boot (born January 10, 1839) was an English-born American agricultural businessman in Central California in the late 19th and early 20th century. He was a promoter of the early raisin industry in Fresno, most prominently as president of the Fresno Raisin Growers Association from 1902 to 1904.

== Birth and early life ==
Robert Boot was born in Nottinghamshire, England on January 10, 1839, to his father, Isaac Boot and mother, Rebecca Boot (née Sutton). The couple also had two daughters. Robert attended Ackworth School, after which he returned to Nottinghamshire where he was employed at a counting house.
