= George Alfred Carpenter =

English physician and paediatrician

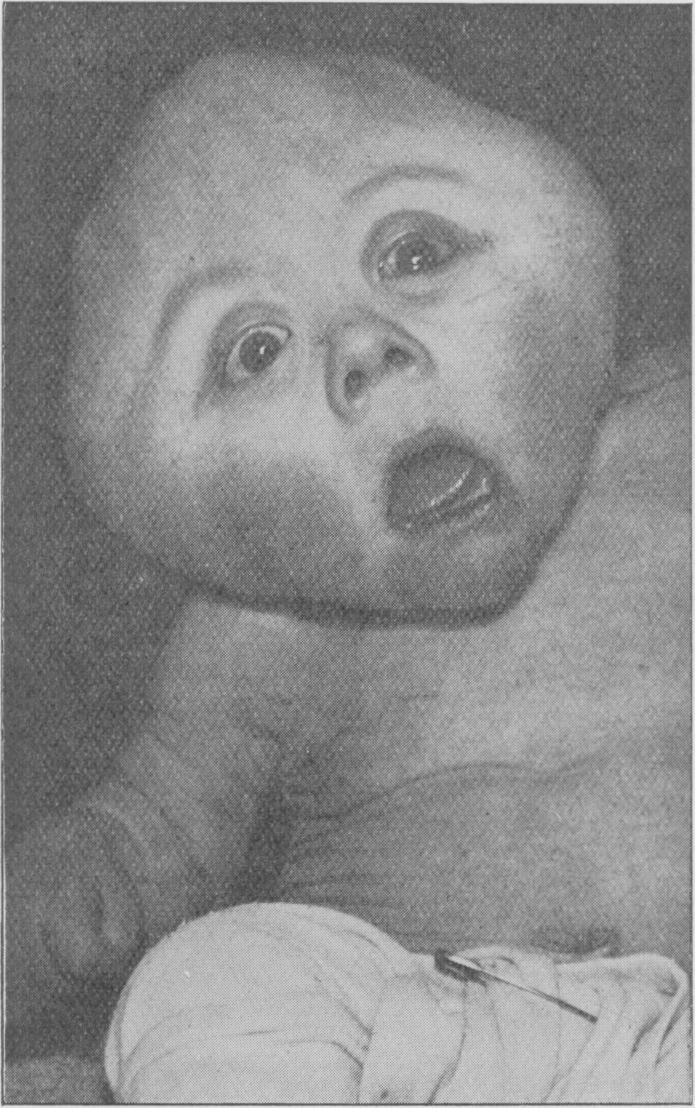
An infant with the syndrome that he discovered, 1909

George Alfred Carpenter (1859–1910) was an English physician and paediatrician. Carpenter Syndrome was named after him.

== Life ==
Born at Lambeth, on 25 December 1859, he was son of John William Carpenter, M.D. (d. 1903), and his wife Mary, daughter of George Butler, of New Shoreham, Sussex. Alfred John Carpenter of Croydon was his uncle.

Carpenter received his early education at King's College School and at Epsom College. He was a medical student in London at St. Thomas's Hospital, where he won prizes, and at Guy's Hospital. He was prosector to the Royal College of Surgeons, and in 1885 became M.R.C.S. and L.S.A. In 1886 he graduated M.B. and in 1890 M.D. at London, having become M.R.C.P., London, in 1889.

Carpenter at first was an alienist. After holding a residential appointment at The Coppice, Nottingham, a private asylum, he returned to London in 1885, and began to specialise in children's diseases. Having served as house surgeon, registrar and chloroformist, he was elected physician to the Evelina Hospital, Southwark.

At the time of his death, Carpenter was physician to the Queen's Hospital for Children, Hackney. He died suddenly at Coldharbour, Waddon, Surrey, on 27 March 1910, and was buried in Old Sanderstead churchyard. Two portraits in oils, one by William Nicholson, were in the possession of his family.

== Work as paediatrician ==
Carpenter's work on diseases of children was voluminous. In 1896 he acted as English editor to Pediatrics, an Anglo-American journal, but the English edition did not last. In 1904 he founded, and edited for the rest of his life, the British Journal of Children's Diseases.

In 1900 Carpenter, with Arthur Ernest Sansom, Henry Ashby and others, founded the successful Society for the Study of Disease in Children, the first British society of its kind. He acted as one of its secretaries for three years, as editor of its Transactions for eight years, and compiled eight volumes of Reports. When the society was incorporated in the Royal Society of Medicine in 1908, and became the section for the study of disease in children, he was elected its president.

Carpenter contributed papers to British and French medical journals; he was a Membre Correspondant de la Société de Pédiatrie de Paris, and also a member and contributor to La Société Française d'Ophtalmologie. His major publications were on congenital malformations of the heart, which was also the subject of his Wightman lecture delivered in 1909 before the section for the study of disease in children, Royal Society of Medicine, and published in the British Journal of Children's Diseases in 1909.

In 1901 Carpenter published The Syphilis of Children in Every-day Practice. A short work, Golden Rules for Diseases of Infants and Children, published in 1901, reached a fourth and revised edition in 1911.

== Family ==
Carpenter married on 21 April 1908 Hélène Jeanne, daughter of Henry, Baron d'Este.

== Notes ==
Attribution

This article incorporates text from a publication now in the public domain: Lee, Sidney, ed. (1912). "Carpenter, George Alfred". Dictionary of National Biography (2nd supplement). Vol. 1. London: Smith, Elder & Co.
