= Harry Ashby =

Harry Ashby may refer to:

- Harry Ashby (engraver) (1744–1818), English engraver
- Harry Ashby (footballer) (1875–1926), English footballer
- Harry Ashby (golfer) (1946–2010), English golfer

== See also ==
- Henry Ashby (disambiguation)
- Harold Ashby (1925–2003), American jazz tenor saxophonist
- Hal Ashby (1929–1988), American film director and editor
