= Sanil Sachar =

Indian poet

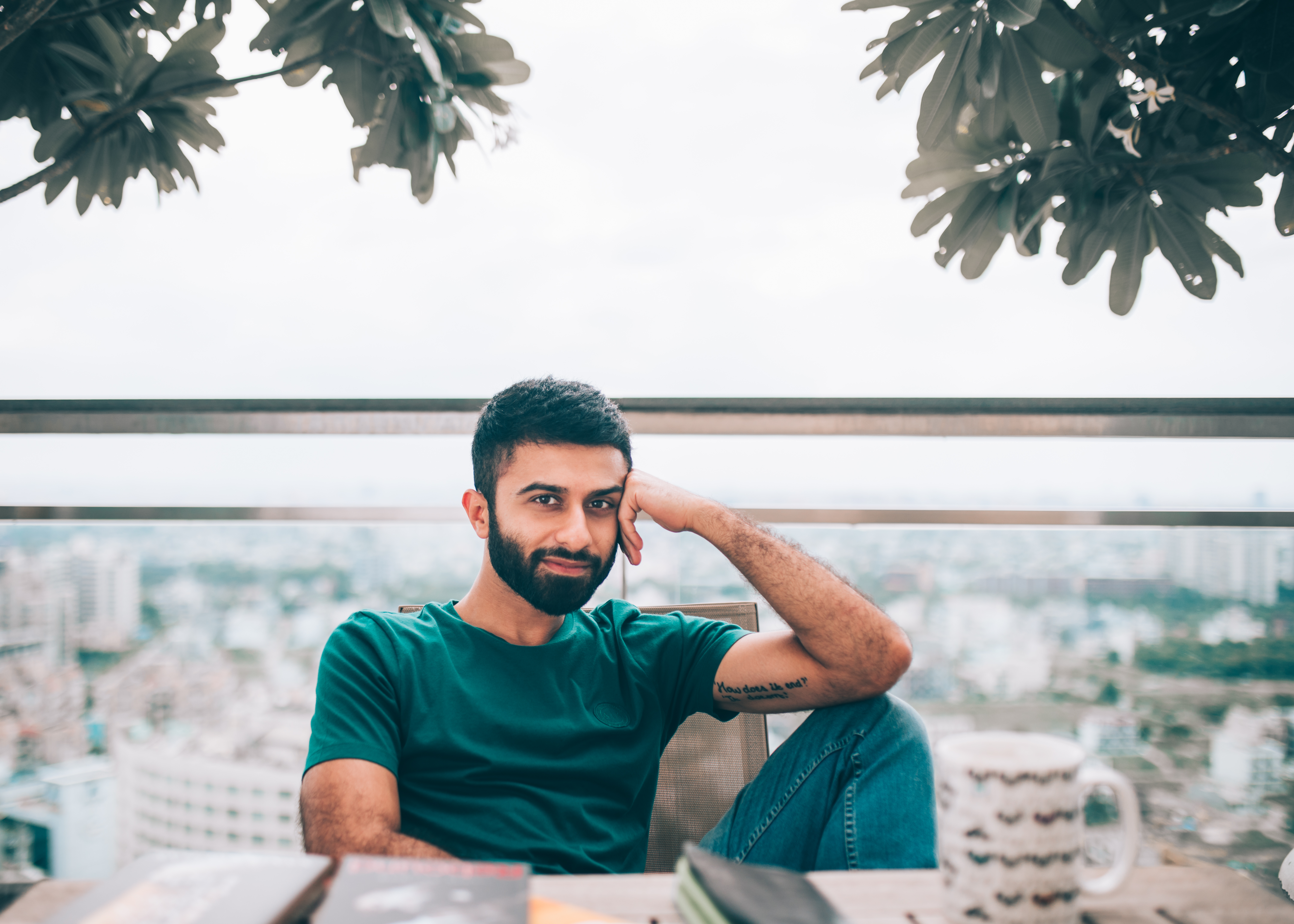
- Born: 16 June 1992 (age 34); New Delhi, India
- Occupations: Author, entrepreneur
- Years active: 2013–present

Sanil Sachar is an Indian author and a founding partner of Huddle, a venture capital firm based in Gurgaon. His debut book, Summer Promises and Other Poems, was released in 2013.

== Early life and education ==
Sachar is the son of Sita and Sanjiv Sachar, the grandson of Rajinder Sachar, and the great-grandson of Bhim Sen Sachar.

After moving to England at the age of 16 he finished his education at Ackworth School.

== Books ==
Sachar's first book, Summer Promises and Other Poems, was published in 2013 by Rupa Publications while he was in his first year of university. The book was publicly launched by lyricist Javed Akhtar. In 2015, Sachar wrote his second book, The Dark Side of Light, which was well-received. His third book, Rebound, is a mystery about a person with schizophrenia against the backdrop of a love story, and it was a bestseller.

== Producer ==
Sachar is the co-producer of Mantra, starring actors Rajat Kapoor, Kalki Koechlin, and Lushin Dubey, which was generally well-received by audiences.
