= Jacob Post =

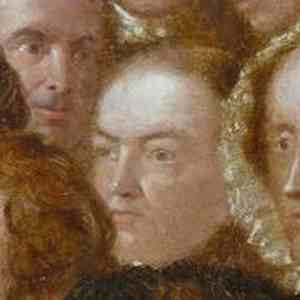
- Post at the 1840 Anti-Slavery Convention. On his left is Lady Byron
- Born: 1774
- Died: 1855 (aged 80–81); Islington
- Resting place: Winchmore Hill, Middlesex
- Known for: Writing

Jacob Post (1774–1855) was an English Quaker and a religious author. He wrote accounts of two founding Quakers: George Fox and William Penn.

== Life ==
Jacob Post was born in Whitefriars, London, on 12 September 1774. His parents, John and Rosamund Post, enrolled him at the relatively new Ackworth School in Yorkshire, which was run by the Society of Friends.

By 1787 Post had moved to Islington and was writing on behalf of the emerging evangelical section of the Quakers. In 1812 he founded a local section of the Bible Society for North London and Islington. In 1837, his eighteen-year-old son died. In the following year he published Extracts from the Diary of Frederick James Post under joint authorship.

Post is on the right near the ladies in this painting of the 1840 Anti-Slavery Convention. Move your cursor to identify Post or click icon to enlarge

In 1840 Post's portrait featured in a painting of the 1840 Anti-Slavery Convention in London. His wife Elizabeth Post died in 1844; Post died on 1 April 1855 at his house in Islington.

Post's output includes two children's books, accounts of founders of the Society of Friends – George Fox and William Penn, the founder of Pennsylvania – and matters of religious dispute in his time.

== Works include ==
- Extracts from the Diary of Frederick James Post and other Manuscripts, with a Memoir (1838)
- Some Popular Customs amongst Christians questioned and compared with Gospel Precepts and Examples (1839)
- On the History and Mystery of (those called) the Sacraments; shewing them to be Jewish Institutions... (1846)
- The Bible: the Book for All (1848)
- Popular Memoir of W. Penn (1850)
- A Brief Memoir of George Fox... for the Information of Strangers (1854)
- The Lord's Supper its origin and history (1854)
