= Free-produce movement =

Boycott of goods produced by slave labor

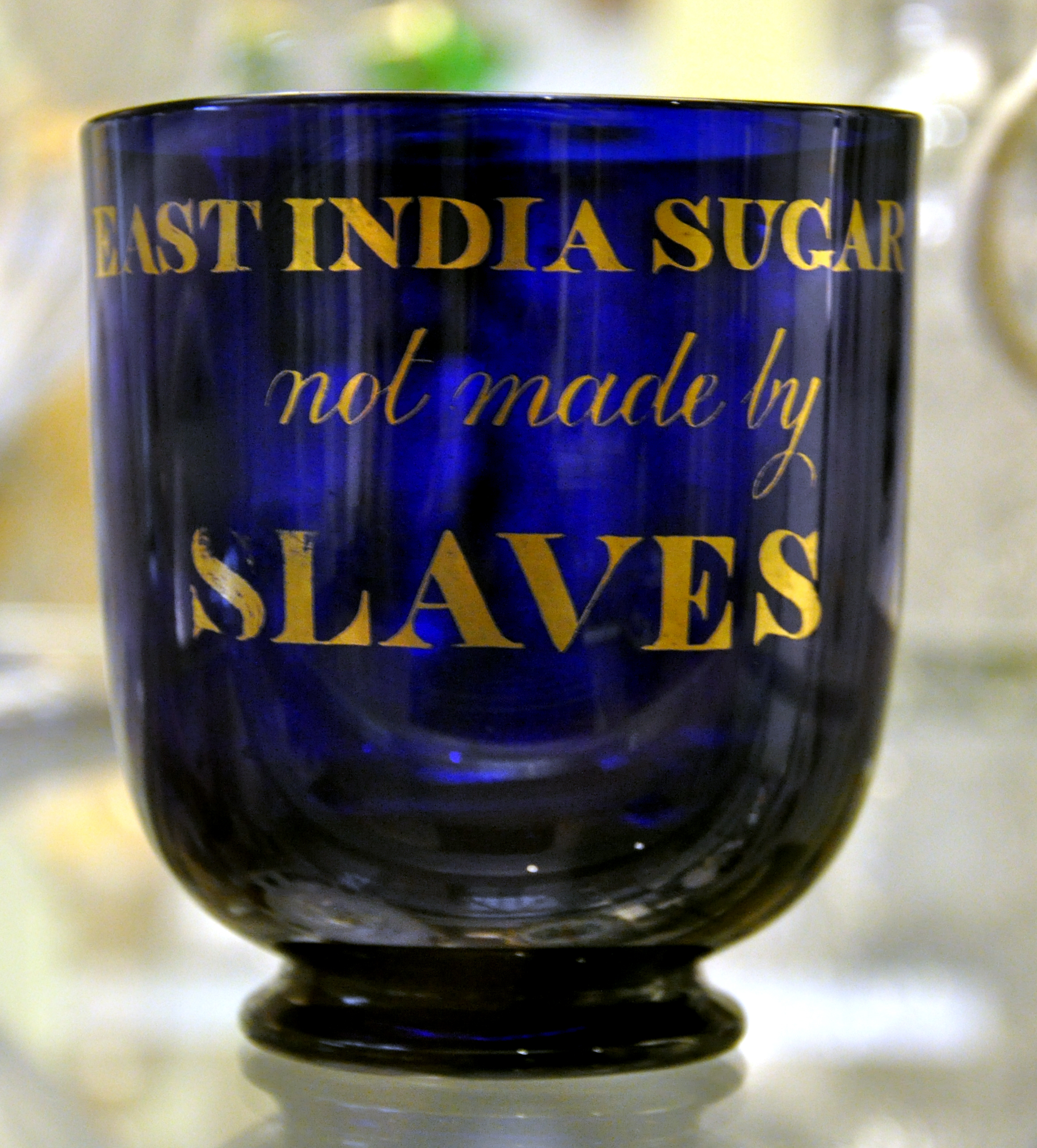
This 1820s sugar bowl describes its contents as "EAST INDIA SUGAR not made by SLAVES"

The free-produce movement was an international boycott of goods produced by slave labor. It was used by the abolitionist movement as a non-violent way for individuals, including the disenfranchised, to fight slavery.

In this context, free signifies "not enslaved" (i.e. "having the legal and political rights of a citizen"). It does not mean "without cost". Similarly, "produce" does not mean just fruits and vegetables, but a wide variety of products made by slaves, including clothing, dry goods, shoes, soaps, ice cream, and candy.

== 18th century ==
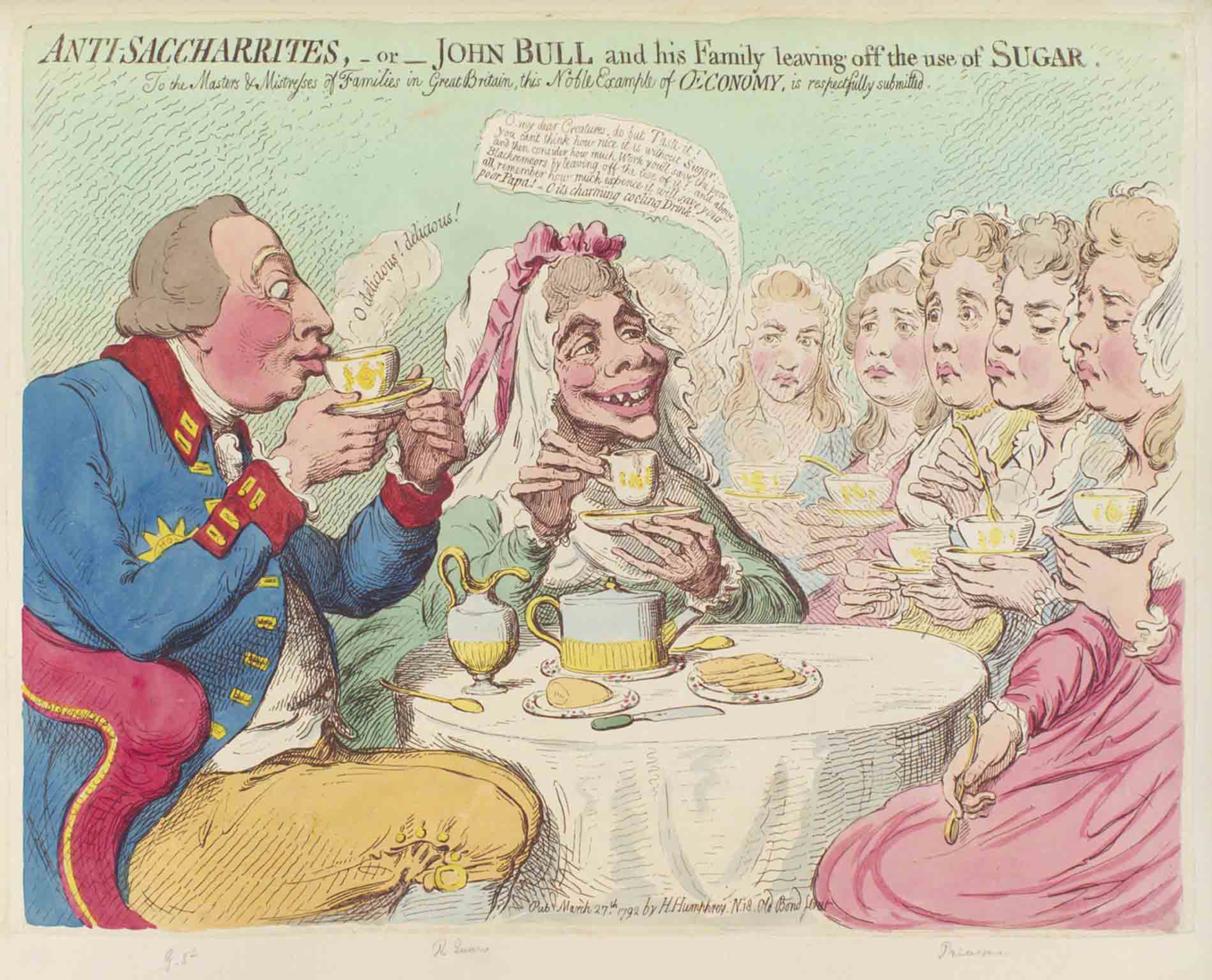
A 1792 political cartoon on the sugar boycott; the British king and queen urge their daughters to drink their tea without sugar, not for humanitarian reasons, but for the sake of saving money.

The concept originated among members of the Religious Society of Friends (Quakers), in the late 18th century. Quakers believed in pacifism and in the spiritual equality of all humankind. Quakers opposed slavery, and by about 1790 had eliminated slaveholding from among their membership. Radical Quakers such as Anthony Benezet and John Woolman went further, voicing their opinion that purchasers of slave-derived goods were guilty of keeping the institution of slavery economically feasible. They argued for a moral and economic boycott of slave-derived goods. The concept proved attractive because it offered a non-violent method of combating slavery.

In the 1780s, the movement spread beyond Quaker circles. British abolitionists, most of them also Quakers and some of them former slaves, formed the Society for Effecting the Abolition of the Slave Trade in 1787. In 1789, the Abolition Bill was introduced in parliament (by William Wilberforce; Quakers were not allowed to stand for parliament). Plantocratic interests slowed its adoption. By 1791, it had still not been passed, and frustration at parliamentary delaying tactics lead to boycott actions. William Fox published a pamphlet urging a boycott of slave sugar; this became the most popular pamphlet of the century, with over a quarter million copies printed (on both sides of the Atlantic). The pamphlet solidified and concentrated abolitionist efforts.

The pamphlet made a case for consumer complicity in slavery: "If we purchase the commodity we participate in the crime. The slave dealer, the slave holder, and the slave driver, are virtually agents of the consumer, and may be considered as employed and hired by him to procure the commodity ... In every pound of sugar used we may be considered as consuming two ounces of human flesh." Rhetoric describing slave produce as figuratively contaminated by the blood, tears, and sweat, of slaves, and as morally polluting, was widely used. Further pamphlets on the same theme followed.

Boycotts were waged by both individual consumers and by shopkeepers and merchants. Also in 1791, an English merchant named James Wright published a newspaper ad to explain why he would no longer sell sugar until he could procure it through channels "more unconnected with Slavery, and less polluted with Human Blood." Women, who could not vote, could promote and participate in a slave sugar boycott. The British boycott, at its height, had more than 400,000 participants. However, as the French Revolution turned violent in mid-1792, grassroots movements lost support which they did not regain until it became known that Napoleon Bonaparte opposed emancipation.

== 19th century ==
Elias Hicks's Observations on the Slavery of Africans and Their Descendents, published in 1811, advocated a consumer boycott of slave-produced goods to remove the economic support for slavery:

Q. 11. What effect would it have on the slave holders and their slaves, should the people of the United States of America and the inhabitants of Great Britain, refuse to purchase or make use of any goods that are the produce of Slavery? A. It would doubtless have a particular effect on the slave holders, by circumscribing their avarice, and preventing their heaping up riches, and living in a state of luxury and excess on the gain of oppression…

Observations on the Slavery of Africans and Their Descendents gave the free-produce movement its central argument for an embargo of all goods produced by slave labor including cotton cloth and cane sugar, in favor of produce from the paid labor of free people. Though the free-produce movement was not intended to be a religious response to slavery, most of the free-produce stores were Quaker in origin, for example the first such store, that of Benjamin Lundy in Baltimore in 1826.

=== Spread ===
In 1826, the American abolitionist boycott began in earnest when abolitionist Quakers in Wilmington, Delaware, drew up a charter for a formal free-produce organization; the same year in Baltimore, Maryland, Lundy opened his store selling only goods obtained by labor from free people.

In 1827, the movement grew broader with the formation in Philadelphia, Pennsylvania, of the "Free Produce Society" founded by Thomas M'Clintock and other radical Quakers. With the Society, they added a new tactic, one that sought to determine the unseen costs of goods such as cotton, tobacco, and sugar which came from the toil of slaves. Quaker women joined the Society, including Lucretia Coffin Mott, who spoke out at Society meetings, giving some of her male associates their first experience of hearing a woman lecture. Lydia Child, who would publish an important volume of abolitionist writings, The Oasis, kept a "free" dry goods store in Philadelphia in 1831.

=== African Americans ===
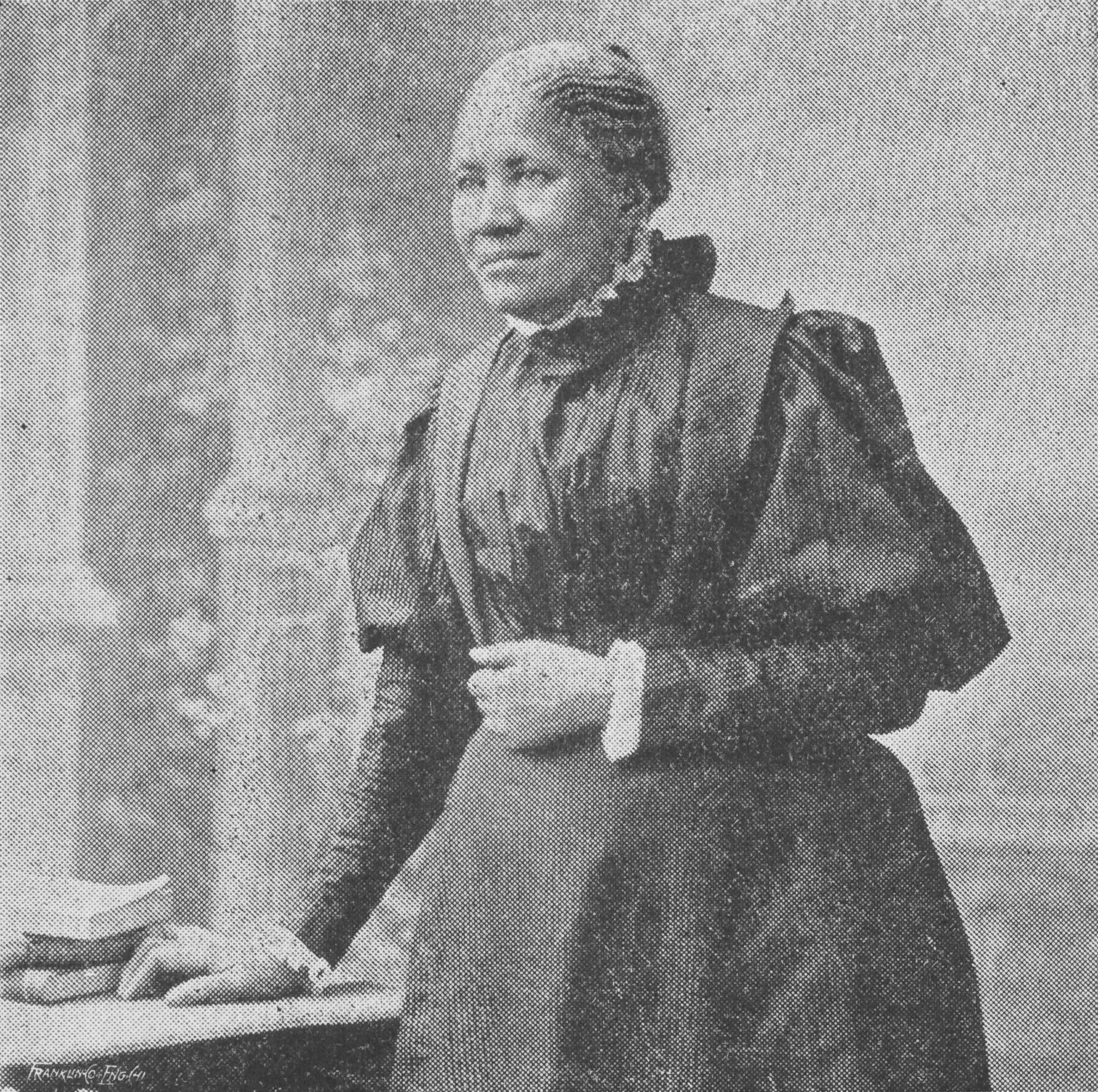
Frances Ellen Watkins Harper supported the free-produce movement, regularly saying she would pay more for a "Free Labor" dress

In 1830, African-American men formed the "Colored Free Produce Society of Pennsylvania", subsequently, African-American women formed the "Colored Female Free Produce Society of Pennsylvania" in 1831. Some black businesses began to feature free produce; William Whipper opened a free grocery next to Bethel Church in Philadelphia, and in the same city, a Negro confectioner used sugar only from free labor sources, and received the order for Angelina Grimké's wedding cake. In New York, a supportive article in Freedom's Journal calculated for its readers that, given typical free Negro consumption of sugar, if 25 black people purchased sugar from slaveholders, then one slave was required to sustain the flow. New York City's small population of African Americans was said to require for their sugar the labor of 50 slaves.

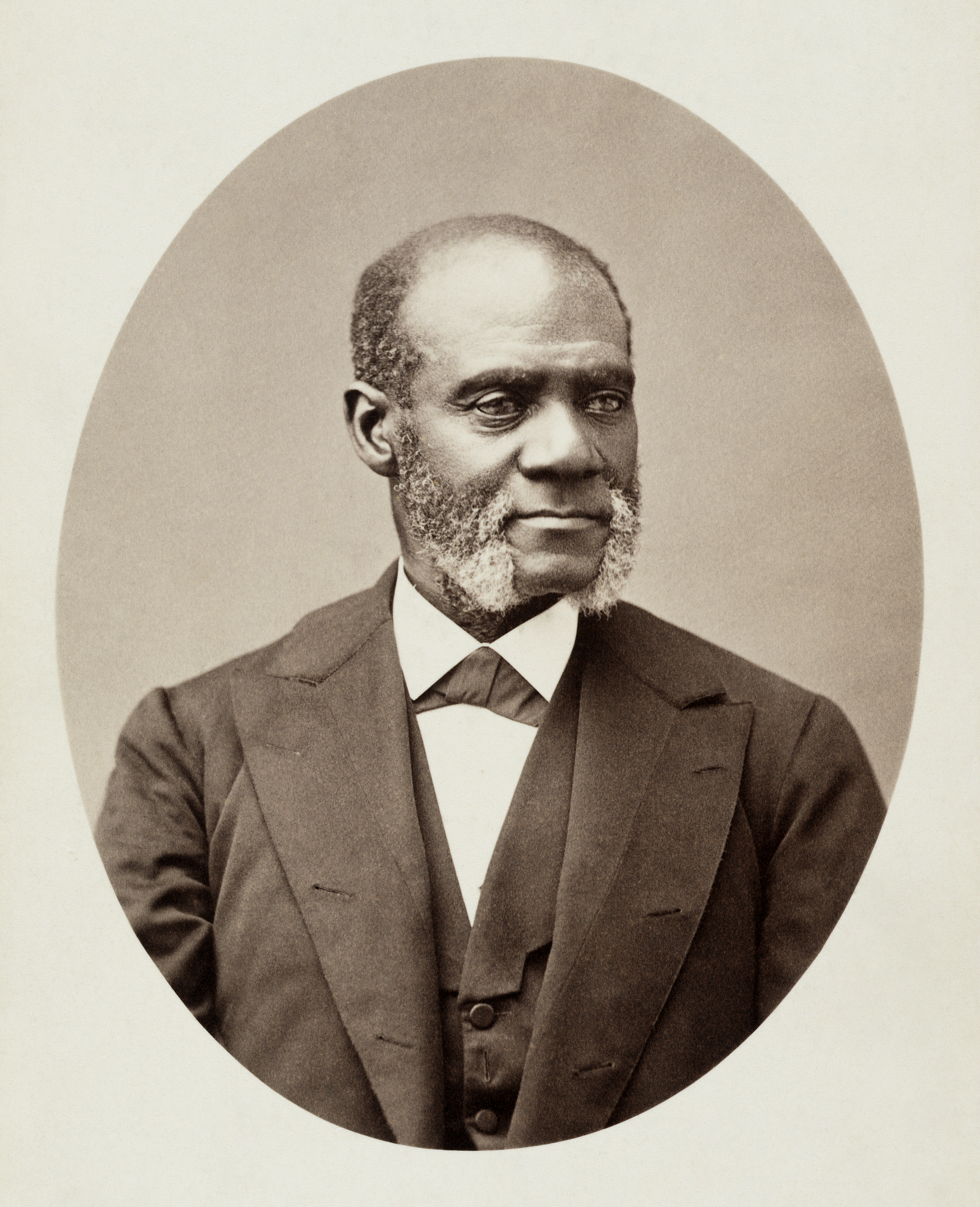
In 1850, Henry Highland Garnet toured Great Britain to urge Britons to support free produce.

Resolutions in favor of free produce were passed at each of the first five conventions held by African Americans in the 1830s. Henry Highland Garnet preached in New York about the possibility that free produce could strike a blow against slavery. Black abolitionist Frances Ellen Watkins always mentioned the free-produce movement in her speeches, saying she would pay a little more for a "Free Labor" dress, even if it were coarser. Watkins called the movement "the harbinger of hope, the ensign of progress, and a means for proving the consistency of our principles and the earnestness of our zeal."

=== American Free Produce Society ===
In 1838, in the new Pennsylvania Hall (Philadelphia) there was a Free Produce store. In the same time and place, supporters from various states held the initial meeting of the Requited [paid] Labor Society. Pennsylvania Hall was burned to the ground three days after its opening, but the Society held another meeting four months later, in Sandiford Hall, "a library and meeting place for African Americans". The result was the American Free Produce Association, which promoted their cause by seeking non-slave alternates to products from slaveholders, and by forming non-slave distribution channels. The Association produced a number of pamphlets and tracts, and published a journal entitled Non-Slaveholder from 1846 to 1854.

=== British societies ===
The British India Society, founded in 1839, supported free produce. UK counterparts to the American Free Produce Society formed in the 1840s–1850s, under the leadership of Anna Richardson, a Quaker slavery abolitionist and peace campaigner based in Newcastle. The Newcastle Ladies' Free Produce Association was established in 1846, and by 1850 there were at least 26 regional associations.

=== Non-slave enterprise ===
Quaker George W. Taylor established a textile mill which used only non-slave cotton. He worked to increase the quality and availability of free-produce cotton goods. Abolitionist Henry Browne Blackwell invested his and his wife Lucy Stone's money in several ventures seeking to make cheaper sugar by using mechanical means and non-slave labor, but the product was never viable, even when he switched his focus from sugar cane to sugar beets.

== Lack of success ==
The free produce movement was not a success and most places abandoned it after a few years. Non-slave produce was more expensive and sometimes hard to locate, or it faced high tariffs blocking imports. In some cases the origin of the goods could not be determined. Sometimes the non-slave goods were of poorer quality; one storeowner "not infrequently received sugar 'with a very disagreeable taste and odor' and rice that was 'very poor, dark and dirty.'" Benefits to slaves or reduction in demand for slave-produced goods was minuscule. Many abolitionists ignored the issue altogether. Though William Lloyd Garrison, founder of the American Anti-Slavery Society, initially proclaimed at a convention in 1840 that his wool suit was made without slave labor, he later examined the results of the movement and criticized it as impossible to enforce, ineffective, and a distraction from more important tasks. The national association disbanded in 1847, but Quakers in Philadelphia continued until 1856.

== See also ==
- Come-outer
- Fair trade
- Free Soil Party
- Veganism
