= Alfred John Carpenter =

English physician

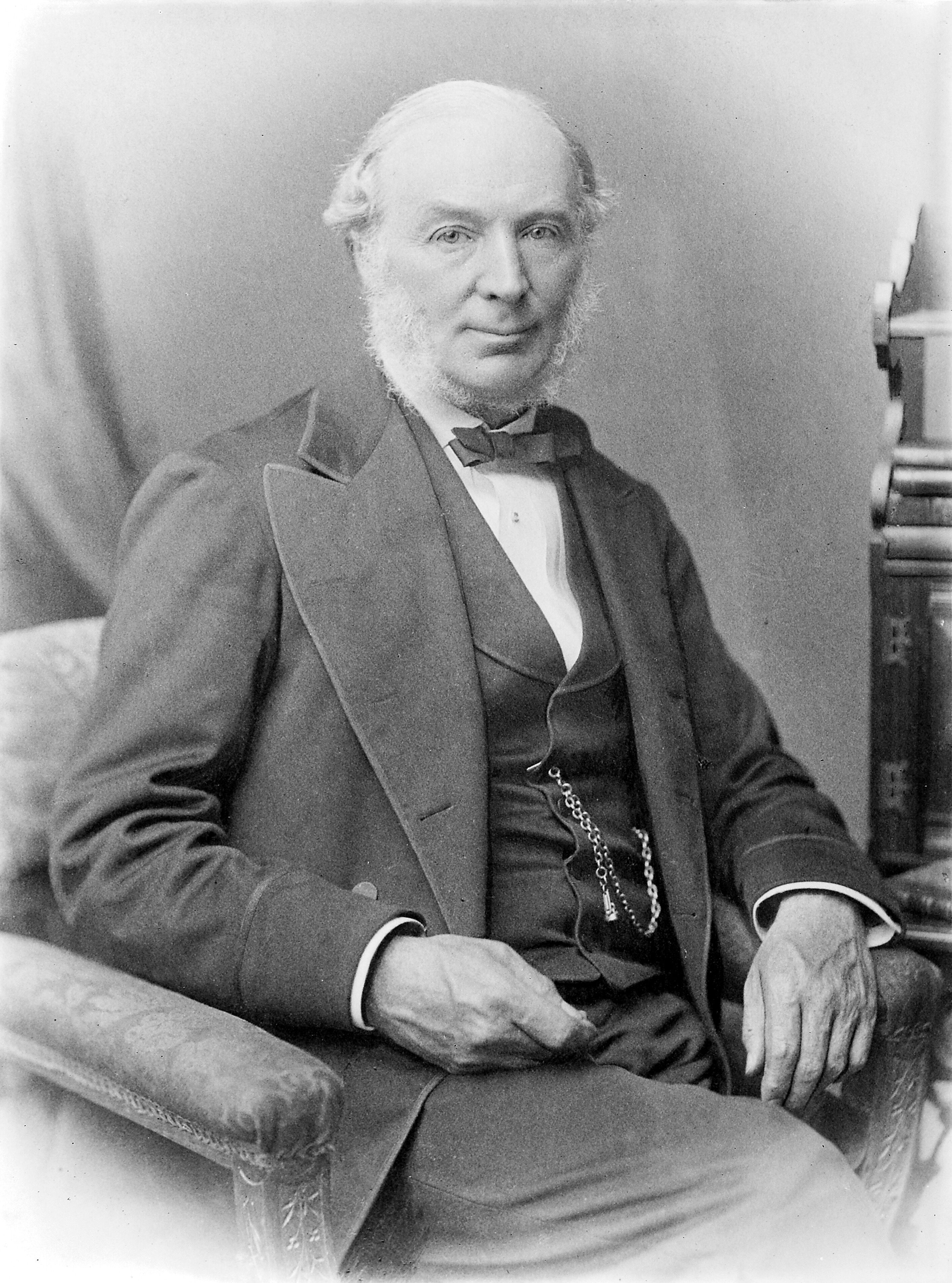
- Born: 28 May 1825
- Died: 27 January 1892 (aged 66)
- Occupation: Physician

Alfred John Carpenter (28 May 1825 – 27 January 1892) was an English physician.

== Biography ==
Carpenter was the son of John Carpenter, surgeon, was born at Rothwell in Northamptonshire on 28 May 1825. He was educated at the Moulton grammar school in Lincolnshire until he was apprenticed to his father in 1839. He became a pupil of William Percival at the Northampton Infirmary in 1841, and afterwards acted as assistant to John Syer Bristowe, the father of Dr. John Syer Bristowe at Camberwell. He entered St. Thomas's Hospital in 1847, taking the first scholarship, and afterwards gaining the treasurer's gold medal. He was admitted a member of the Royal College of Surgeons of England and a licentiate of the Society of Apothecaries in 1851, and after serving the offices of house surgeon and resident accoucheur at St. Thomas's Hospital, he commenced general practice at Croydon in 1852. In 1865 he graduated M.B. and in 1859 M.D. at the London University, and in 1883, when he gave up general for consulting practice, he was admitted a member of the Royal College of Physicians of London. He was lecturer on public health at St. Thomas's Hospital 1875–84, ond in 1881 he was elected a vice-president of the Social Science Association. He stood twice for parliament in the liberal interest—in 1885 for Reigate, and in 1886 for North Bristol, but in each case unsuccessfully. Carpenter rendered important services to the British Medical Association, where he was president of the south-eastern branch in 1872, a member of the council in 1873, president of the council 1878–81, and president of the section of public health at the Worcester meeting in 1882. In 1860 he began to attend the archbishops of Canterbury at Addington, where he was medical adviser in succession to Archbishops Sumner, Longley, Tait, and Benson. He was an examiner at the Society of Apothecaries, and he acted as examiner in public health at the universities of Cambridge and London.

He died on 27 January 1892, and is buried in Croydon cemetery. A bust by E. Roscoe Mullins, executed for the Croydon Literary and Scientific Institution, is in the public hall at Croydon. He married, on 22 June 1853, Margaret Jane, eldest daughter of Evan Jones, marshal of the high court of admiralty, by whom he had three sons and one daughter.

Dr. Carpenter believed that healthy homes made healthy people, and his life was devoted to the conversion of this belief into practice. His activity extended over the whole range of sanitary science. He felt the deepest interest in the application of sewage to the land, which he held to be the proper way of dealing with it, and as chairman of the Croydon sewage farm he made it a model which was afterwards widely copied. He studied the general sanitary conditions of Croydon with great care, he established baths, and ventilated the sewers.

He promoted in every way in his power the Habitual Drunkards Act 1879; and in 1878, when he was orator of the Medical Society of London, he took 'Alcoholic Drinks' as the subject of his oration. He was for many years chairman of the Whitgift foundation at Croydon.

Besides many small works and papers upon sanitary medicine and alcoholic drinks, Carpenter published 'The Principles and Practice of School Hygiene,' London, 1887, 12mo.

The physician George Alfred Carpenter was his nephew.
