= Mary Garnet Barboza =

Campaigner for women's education in Liberia (1845 – 1890)

- Born: Mary Garnet; February 11, 1845; Troy, New York
- Died: 1890 (aged 44–45)
- Occupation: educator
- Known for: Founded school for girls in Liberia
- Parents: Henry Highland Garnet (father); Julia Williams (mother)

Mary Garnet Barboza (1845 – 1890) was an African-American school founder and campaigner for women's education in Liberia.

She was born Mary Garnet on February 11, 1845, in Troy, New York, the only surviving child of abolitionist Henry Highland Garnet and his wife, abolitionist Julia Williams. In 1866 she married Antero Barboza, a black Brazilian civil rights campaigner. They had four children.

From November 1880, she and her family emigrated to Brewerville, Liberia. Her father joined them the next year and died there in 1882. She founded the Garnet Memorial School in his memory with the support of American and British anti-slavery societies and the Presbyterian church. The school gave industrial training to 125 girls.

In 1885, having lost funding from the New York State Colonization Society, the Barbozas traveled to America to raise support from individual philanthropists. In 1888, Mary was in England speaking at Manchester and Birmingham to raise money for her school, to the interest of the British press.
