= Listed buildings in Ackworth, West Yorkshire =

Ackworth is a civil parish in the metropolitan borough of the City of Wakefield, West Yorkshire, England. The parish contains 36 listed buildings that are recorded in the National Heritage List for England. Of these, one is listed at Grade I, the highest of the three grades, four are at Grade II*, the middle grade, and the others are at Grade II, the lowest grade. The parish contains the settlements of High Ackworth, Low Ackworth, Ackworth Moor Top, and part of East Hardwick, and the surrounding countryside. Most of the listed buildings are houses, cottages and associated structures. The other listed buildings include a church and items in the churchyard, a plague stone or cross base, a village cross, former almshouses, a school and an associated Quaker meeting house, three guide posts, and two mileposts,

== Key ==
Grade	Criteria
I	Buildings of exceptional interest, sometimes considered to be internationally important
II*	Particularly important buildings of more than special interest
II	Buildings of national importance and special interest

== Buildings ==
Name and location	Photograph	Date	Notes	Grade
Cross slab 53.65738°N 1.33539°W	—	Late medieval (probable)	The cross slab is in the churchyard of St Cuthbert's Church to the north of the church. It is in magnesian limestone, and has a low base, and a pitched lid with a raised border and a full-length decorated cross.	II
Plague stone 53.66556°N 1.32506°W		Late medieval (probable)	The structure, at a road junction, may be a cross base. It is in sandstone, and consists of two stones about 1 metre (3 ft 3 in) wide on top of each other. In the centre of the upper stone is a square socket.	II
Village cross 53.65665°N 1.33460°W		Late medieval (possible)	The village cross stands at a road junction, and is in sandstone. It has an octagonal base of three steps, about 4 metres (13 ft) in diameter, a low octagonal pedestal, and a chamfered shaft with a moulded cap and a ball finial.	II
St Cuthbert's Church; 53.65732°N 1.33512°W		15th century	The oldest part of the church is the tower, the rest was rebuilt in 1855 following a fire. The church is built in sandstone with stone slate roofs, and consists of a nave with a clerestory, north and south aisles, a south porch, a chancel with a north vestry, and a west tower. The tower is in Perpendicular style, and has four stages, diagonal buttresses, a west doorway with a pointed arch, a moulded surround and a hood mould, a three-light window, a diamond-shaped clock face on the south front, three gargoyles, and an embattled parapet with crocketed corner pinnacles. The porch is gabled, and has a doorway with a chamfered surround, a hood mould, and a niche with a statue.	II*
Holt's Cottage; 53.64224°N 1.34185°W		Late 17th century (probable)	A farmhouse, later a private house, it is in sandstone, and has a stone slate roof with coped gables and kneelers. There are two storeys and an attic, and three bays. The doorway has a chamfered surround, most of the windows are top-hung casements, and in the left gable end are former mullioned windows.	II
Priory Cottage; 53.65506°N 1.33615°W		Late 17th century (probable)	A farmhouse, later altered and a private house, it is in rendered sandstone, and has a pantile roof with coped gables and kneelers. There are two storeys, three bays, and a rear outshut. The doorway has a plain surround and a pediment, and to the right is a tripartite window with a sash. The other windows on the front are top-hung casements, and at the rear are sliding sashes.	II
Rylstone House; 53.65491°N 1.33517°W	—	Late 17th century	A farmhouse, later two dwellings, in sandstone with a tile roof. There are two and three storeys under one roof, six bays, and a linear single-depth plan, with the gable end facing the road. The left part has a modern porch, a bay window, top-hung casement windows, and in the top floor is a small round-headed window with Y-tracery. In the left return is a modern square bay window, and the remains of a mullioned window. The right part has a Tuscan porch, a canted bay window to the right, casement windows, and three small round-arched windows, two with Y-tracery.	II
The Old Hall and garden wall 53.65676°N 1.33798°W		Late 17th century	Originally a hall house, it is in sandstone on a chamfered plinth, with continuous hood moulds, and a stone slate roof. There is a T-shaped plan, with a front range of two storeys and attics, five bays, two gables, and coped parapets. The inserted central doorway has a three-light fanlight, and the windows are mullioned, those in the ground floor also with transoms. In the right return is a cross window and a Tudor arched doorway. On the east side of the rear wing is another Tudor arched doorway, and in the west side is a small unusual squint window. Enclosing the front garden is a sandstone wall with rounded coping and a gateway in line with the front door.	II*
The Masons Arms; 53.64293°N 1.33973°W		1682	Most of the public house dates from the 18th century. It is in sandstone with a stone slate roof, hipped on the left. and with a coped gable and kneelers on the right. There are two storeys and a T-shaped plan, with a front range of five bays and a rear wing. The doorway has a chamfered surround, a dated lintel, and a hood mould, above which is a large signboard. The windows vary, and include sliding sashes.	II
Lowther Hospital; 53.65624°N 1.33432°W		1741	Originally almshouses and a schoolroom, the building is in sandstone with a hipped stone slate roof. There is a single storey and nine bays, the middle three bays projecting under a pediment forming the original schoolroom. The central doorway has a Gibbs surround, a fanlight, a triple keystone, and a cornice, above which is a pedimented panel with a painted inscription. In the outer bays are doorways, and sash windows with Gibbs surrounds.	II
126 Pontefract Road, High Ackworth; 53.65655°N 1.33201°W	—	Mid 18th century	The house is in sandstone with sill bands and a slate roof. There are three storeys and cellars, and a symmetrical front of three bays. Two semicircular steps lead up to a central doorway that has a moulded surround incorporating a Gibbs surround, scrolled jambs, and a dentilled pediment. Above it is a Venetian window and a Diocletian window, and the other windows are casements imitating sashes.	II
Stable, granary and dovecote north of Ackworth Grange; 53.65193°N 1.30556°W	—	18th century	The building is in sandstone, with a top storey in brick, and a slate roof. There are three storeys and a rectangular plan. In the west front are three doorways, one with a segmental head, small windows, square openings, and slit vents. The south front has a coped gable, a blocked square window, and a segmental-headed window. Inside, there is a pigeon loft lined with nest boxes.	II
Sikes tomb chest 53.65713°N 1.33529°W	—	Mid 18th century	The tomb chest is in the churchyard of St Cuthbert's Church to the south-southwest of the church, and is to the memory of members of the Sikes family. It is in sandstone, and has panelled sides with rusticated quoins. On the lid is a round-arched panel with a moulded surround, a fluted keystone, stylised winged angel heads in the spandrels, and an inscription.	II
Ackworth School; 53.64973°N 1.33418°W		1758–65	Originally a Foundling hospital, and since 1778 a Quaker residential school, it is built in sandstone with hipped roofs of stone slate and some slate. There are three main blocks, linked by Tuscan two-storey eight-bay colonnaded quadrants. The blocks are in Palladian style, with two storeys, each with a symmetrical front of 13 bays, the middle three bays projecting under a pediment containing an oculus. In the centre of the middle block is a doorway approached by steps, with an Ionic architrave and an inscribed pediment. The windows in all the blocks are sashes. On the roof of each outer block is a clock turret with an octagonal cupola and a weathervane. Behind the east block is a narrow courtyard, Shed Court, with a single-storey 14-bay colonnade, in the centre of which is a pedimented entrance archway with impost bands and a keystone.	I
Gate piers, Eden Place; 53.65625°N 1.33308°W	—	Mid to late 18th century	A pair of sandstone gate piers, square in section, and about 2 metres (6 ft 7 in) high. Each pier has a prominent moulded cap and a ball finial.	II
130 and 132 Pontefract Road, High Ackworth; 53.65664°N 1.33182°W	—	Late 18th century	A house at right angles to the road, later divided, it is in sandstone with a hipped slate roof. There are three storeys, with one bay facing the road, behind which is a range of three bays, and a wing beyond that. On the front facing the road is a two-storey canted bay window, in the middle floor with Doric mullions, and above is a three-light window and a pediment. Elsewhere, the windows are sashes, and other features include a doorway with a reeded architrave and a cornice, and a blind window with a moulded architrave and an open segmental pediment on consoles.	II
Cleveland Lodge; 53.64099°N 1.34251°W		Late 18th century	The house, later divided, is in sandstone, with rusticated quoins, and a hipped stone slate roof. There are three storeys, a double-depth plan and an L-shaped plan, with a front of five bays and a rear wing on the left. Over the middle three bays is a pediment, and there are doorways with fanlights in the second and fourth bays. The windows are sashes, some of them tripartite.	II
Eden Place; 53.65613°N 1.33268°W	—	Late 18th century (probable)	The house, later used for other purposes, is in sandstone, with a sill band, a modillion cornice and blocking course, and a hipped stone slate roof. There are two storeys and cellars, a single-depth linear plan, consisting of a main block with a symmetrical front of three bays, beyond which is a service wing and a garden house. In the centre of the main block, five semicircular steps lead up to a doorway with a Gibbs surround and a pediment, and the windows are sashes, those in the ground floor tripartite. In the left return is a full-height bow window. To the right, the service wing has two bays, and beyond that a single-storey three-bay range, the outer bays pedimented, and the right bay is the garden house with an oculus in the pediment.	II
Ackworth House; 53.65173°N 1.30537°W		c. 1786	A large house that was later extended, it is in sandstone, rendered on the front, with a sill band, and a hipped slate roof. The north front has three storeys, a double-depth plan, and five bays. Over the middle three bays is a pediment containing a floral medallion and a swag, and surmounted by an urn. The central doorway has an architrave of Tuscan semi-columns, a triglyph frieze, a segmental pediment, and side windows. The windows are sashes, the central window in the middle floor with an architrave and a cornice. The added south range has two storeys and three bays. The central bay contains a tripartite window, above which is a Venetian window and an open pediment, and the outer bays contain full-height canted bay windows.	II
Ackworth Grange; 53.65173°N 1.30537°W		Late 18th or early 19th century	The house is in sandstone, with a modillioned cornice, a low blocking course, and a hipped slate roof. There are two storeys, a symmetrical front of three bays, and a rear, possibly earlier, range. In the centre is a Doric doorway, a semicircular fanlight with radiating glazing bars, and a pediment with mutules. Flanking this are full-height bow windows, and the other windows are sashes.	II
Hundhill Hall; 53.66310°N 1.30812°W		Late 18th or early 19th century	A country house in sandstone, with bands, scrolled iron gutter brackets, and hipped stone slate roofs. There is a U-shaped double-depth plan, consisting of a main block with three storeys and five bays, and recessed two-storey two-bay wings. The central doorway has a moulded architrave and a cornice on consoles. The windows are sashes, and in the return of the right wing is a canted bay window.	II
Guide post, Station Road junction 53.64965°N 1.33272°W		1801	The guide post on a traffic island at the junction of Station Road with Pontefract Road is in sandstone and about 3 metres (9.8 ft) high. It has a hexagonal section and banded rustication, and consists of a straight-sided pedestal, a tapered column, a large triangular cap with inscriptions on all sides and some finger-pointers, and is surmounted by an ornamental wrought iron stand with three lamps. On the sides of the cap are the distances to Pontefract, Hemsworth, East Hardwick, Snaith, Wentbridge, and Doncaster.	II*
14 and 16 Station Road, Low Ackworth; 53.64979°N 1.33021°W		1811	A school, later two houses, in sandstone, the ground floor rusticated, with a band, and a slate roof. There are two storeys and an L-shaped plan, consisting of a symmetrical front with three wide bays and a rear wing. The middle bay has a shaped pediment with an inscribed tablet, and the outer bays have pseudo-pediments. In the centre are two doorways with fanlights and side windows, and the windows are a mix of sashes and casements.	II
Coach house, Ackworth School; 53.64967°N 1.33568°W		Early 19th century (probable)	The coach house, later used for other purposes, is in sandstone, and has a stone slate roof with coped gables and kneelers. There are two storeys, a rectangular plan, and a three-bay open arcade in the ground floor. The basket arches are carried on cylindrical columns with square capitals. In the upper floor are square windows, and on the right return is an external flight of steps to an upper doorway.	II
Coach house and hay loft, Ackworth School; 53.64969°N 1.33595°W	—	Early 19th century	The coach house, later used for other purposes, is in sandstone, and has a stone slate roof. There are two storeys, a rectangular plan, and a three-bay blocked arcade in the ground floor. The basket arches are carried on cylindrical columns with square capitals. The upper floor contains three blocked windows, and in the right gable wall is a blocked arch and a loft door.	II
Guide post, Bell Lane junction 53.64317°N 1.33750°W		Early 19th century	The guide post at the junction of Bell Lane with Barnsley Road is in sandstone and about 3 metres (9.8 ft) high. It has a three-stage semicircular base, and consists of a tapering column with a flat back and a conical cap. On the column are paired recessed inscribed panels.	II
Manor House; 53.65694°N 1.33446°W		Early 19th century	The house is in sandstone with some brick, and has a moulded cornice, a blocking course, and a slate roof with coped gables. There are two storeys and attics, and a U-shaped double-depth plan, consisting of a symmetrical three bay range with two rear wings. The central round-headed doorway has an architrave, a fanlight, and a pediment, and the windows are sashes. In the left gable wall is a round-headed attic window. The left wing incorporates outbuildings, and has an attached four-step mounting block, and external steps to a granary. At the rear of the house is a full-height round-headed stair window.	II
The Mount; 53.65102°N 1.32666°W	—	Early 19th century (probable)	The house, which was later altered and extended, is in sandstone with a slate roof. There are three storeys, a double-depth plan, a symmetrical front of three bays, and two-storey, single-bay recessed wings with square-topped parapets. In the centre is a Tuscan porch flanked by canted bay windows, and the other windows are sashes with architraves.	II
Guide post, Long Lane junction 53.65719°N 1.32957°W		1827	The guide post on a traffic island at the junction of Long Lane with Pontefract Road is in sandstone, partly rendered, and about 3 metres (9.8 ft) high. It has an octagonal section, a base of two chamfered blocks, a tapered column, a large triangular cap, with a ball finial surmounted by a small cup-shaped iron bracket with a spur. On the sides of the cap are painted pointing fingers and the distances to Pontefract, Barnsley, Darrington, York, Sheffield, and East Hardwick.	II
The Court; 53.65278°N 1.32406°W	—	Early 19th century	A large sandstone house with a double-depth plan, a main block with two storeys and attics, three bays and a pediment containing a lunette, and single-storey wings with semicircular ends. On the front is a wrought iron verandah in both floors. Five steps lead up to a central recessed round-headed doorway with a Tuscan architrave, flanked by tripartite windows with pilasters. Above it are double doors with a moulded architrave, and tripartite windows with fluted pilasters. The ground floor of the verandah has an openwork balustrade ending in stone piers, and the upper floor has a seven-bay arcade of segmental arches. At the rear is a central doorway with an architrave and a cornice, and a round-headed stair window.	II
Garden house, The Court; 53.65291°N 1.32326°W	—	Early 19th century	The garden house is in sandstone, with a prominent cornice and a concave soffit. There is a rectangular plan and a single bay. On the corner are pilasters, and the building is without a roof. On the west side is a square-headed doorway with a large fanlight, and in the south side is a tall tapering window.	II
Milepost at SE446 190; 53.66632°N 1.32513°W		Early to mid 19th century	The milestone is on the west side of Pontefract Road (A628 road). It is in sandstone with cast iron overlay, and has a triangular section and a rounded top. On the top is "BARNSLEY & PONTEFRACT ROAD" and "ACKWORTH", and on the sides are the distances to Pontefract and Barnsley.	II
Milepost opposite 66–70 Pontefract Road; 53.65470°N 1.33539°W		Early to mid 19th century	The milestone is on the west side of Pontefract Road (A628 road). It is in sandstone with cast iron overlay, and has a triangular section and a rounded top. On the top is "BARNSLEY & PONTEFRACT ROAD" and "ACKWORTH", and on one side is "BARN".	II
Quaker Meeting House and lodge 53.65013°N 1.33349°W		1846–47	The Quaker meeting house and lodge are in sandstone with slate roofs, and is in Classical style. The meeting house has two storeys and a rectangular plan, with an entrance front of three bays, and five bays on the sides. Across the ground floor of the entrance front is a Tuscan colonnade of coupled columns with an entablature. The doorways and sash windows have architraves, and above is a pediment containing an oculus. The lodge attached to the right has one storey and fronts of two bays, with pilasters and semi-columns.	II*
32–44 Barnsley Road, Low Ackworth; 53.64930°N 1.33245°W		1847	A terrace of seven houses in sandstone with a hipped slate roof. There are two storeys and 17 bays. In the terrace is a segmental-arched carriage passage, above which is a pediment. The doorways have fanlights, and the windows are sashes.	II
Lychgate, St Cuthbert's Church; 53.65704°N 1.33493°W		1878	The lychgate at the entrance to the churchyard has side walls in sandstone, the superstructure is in oak, and the roof has red tiles. Inside is a brass plaque with an inscription and the date.	II
