= Henry Highland Garnet =

American abolitionist (1815–1882)

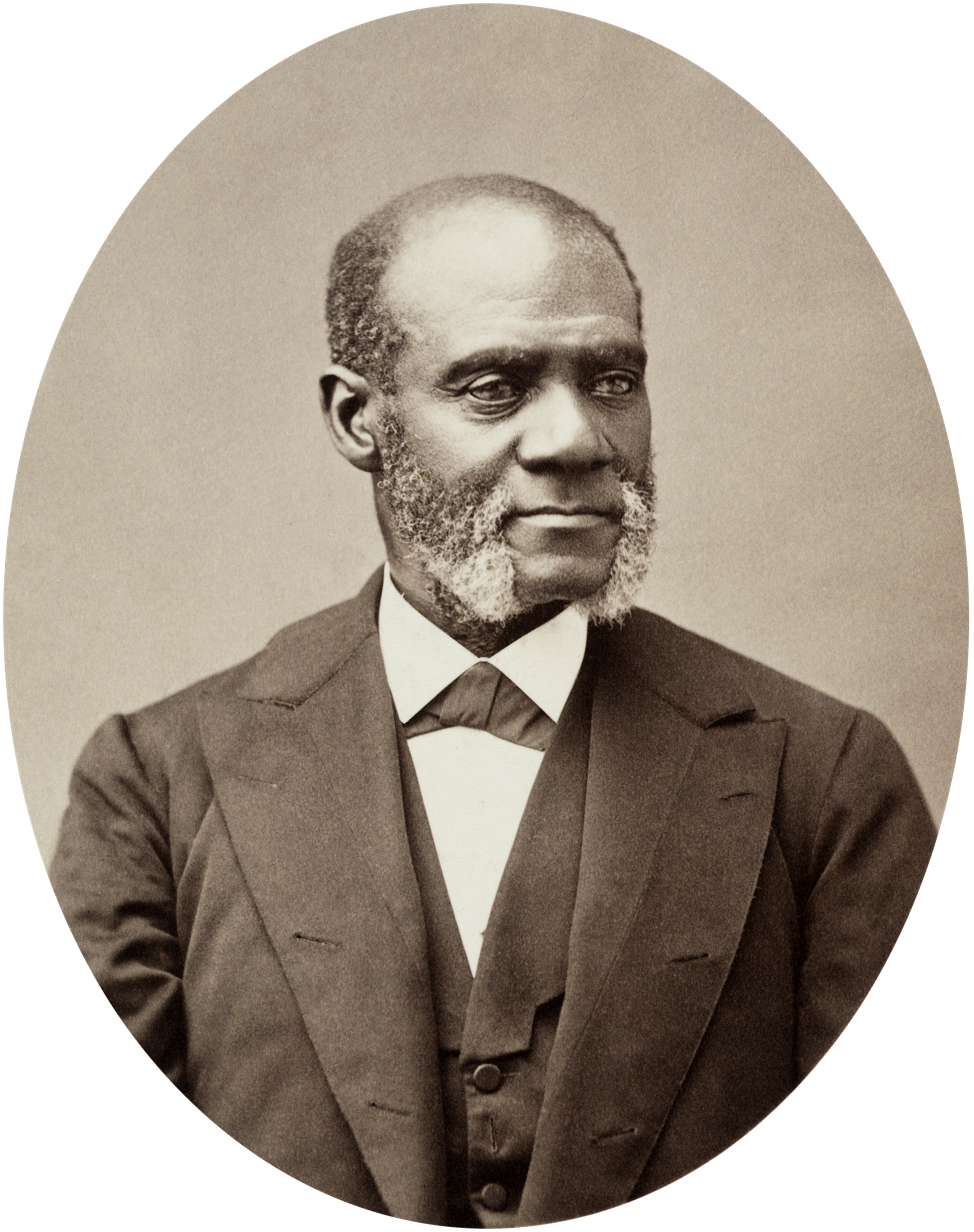
- Born: December 23, 1815; Chesterville, Maryland, U.S.
- Died: February 13, 1882 (aged 66); Monrovia, Liberia
- Education: Oneida Institute
- Occupations: Minister; abolitionist
- Spouse: Julia Ward Williams

Religious life
- Religion: Christian (Presbyterian)

Henry Highland Garnet (December 23, 1815 – February 13, 1882) was an American abolitionist, minister, educator, orator, and diplomat. Having escaped as a child from slavery in Maryland with his family, he grew up in New York City. He was educated at the African Free School, and later the Noyes Academy and the Oneida Institute. As a Presbyterian minister, his drive for abolitionism was based in religion.

Garnet was a prominent member of the movement that favored political action over moral suasion. Renowned for his skills as a public speaker, he urged enslaved African Americans to take direct action in freeing themselves from slavery. Garnet was a supporter of the emigration of American free blacks to Mexico, Liberia, or the West Indies, founding the African Civilization Society alongside Martin Delany.

He was a member of Prince Hall Freemasonry, an African American fraternal organization that provided sick and death benefits for members as well as fought for abolition and civil rights.

In 1841, Garnet married abolitionist Julia Ward Williams and they had three children. Stella (Mary Jane) Weems, a runaway slave from Maryland, lived with the Garnets. She was likely adopted by them and employed as their governess. When Henry preached against slavery, he brought her up to talk about her own experiences and about her family still enslaved in Maryland.

In 1852, Garnet became a missionary with the United Presbyterian Church of Scotland. He traveled to Jamaica with his family until 1855, when he returned to the United States due to health concerns.

On Sunday, February 12, 1865, he delivered a sermon in the U.S. House of Representatives while it was not in session, becoming the first African American to speak in that chamber. His sermon was given on the occasion of Congress' passage of the Thirteenth Amendment, and the end of slavery.

== Biography ==
=== Early life and education ===
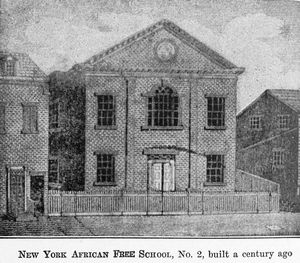
Lithograph of African Free School which Garnet attended

Henry Garnet was born into slavery in Chesterville (then New Market), Kent County, Maryland, on December 23, 1815. "[H]is grandfather was an African chief and warrior, and in a tribal fight he was captured and sold to slave-traders who brought him to this continent where he was owned by Colonel William Spencer." According to James McCune Smith, Garnet's father was George Trusty and his enslaved mother was "a woman of extraordinary energy."

In 1824, the family, which included a total of 11 members, secured permission to attend a funeral, and from there they all escaped in a covered wagon, via Wilmington, Delaware, where they were helped by the Quaker and Underground Railroad stationmaster Thomas Garrett.

When Garnet was ten years old, his family reunited and moved to New York City, where from 1826 through 1831, Garnet attended the African Free School. His education there was interrupted in 1828 when Garnet had to find employment, traveling twice to Cuba as a cabin boy, and once as a cook and steward on a schooner running between New York City and Alexandria, Virginia. When he returned from the latter voyage in 1829, Garnet found that his family had been located by slave hunters. His sister, Eliza (born Mary), (Note: Garnet's father changed his family's given names when they escaped slavery and also changed its surname to Garnet from Trusty.) was arrested, but was able to free herself by proving residence in the free state of New York. His father jumped off of the roof of a two-story building to escape the slave catchers. Garnet, likely with his mother in mind, who had escaped by running to a corner store, took a knife and walked onto Broadway, waiting to be found and confronted by the slave catchers. His friends found him instead and took him out of the city to Jericho, Long Island, where he stayed under the protection of Quaker Thomas Willis. He then became an indentured servant to Captain Epenetus Smith of Smithtown, Long Island, but suffered an injury to his right leg and managed to be released from his indentures later in 1829, whereupon he returned to the African Free School for a year.

While in school, Garnet began his career in abolitionism. His classmates at the African Free School included Charles L. Reason, George T. Downing, and Ira Aldridge. From 1831, he continued his studies at the Phoenix High School for Colored Youth. While a student there he began to attend a Sunday school at the First Colored Presbyterian Church, also known as Shiloh Presbyterian Church, the first African American Presbyterian Church in New York City, and was baptized as a Christian by Reverend Theodore Sedgwick Wright, with whom he was friends for the remainder of Wright's life.

In 1834, Garnet, William H. Day, and David Ruggles established the all-male Garrison Literary and Benevolent Association. It garnered mass support among whites, but the club ultimately had to move due to racist feelings.

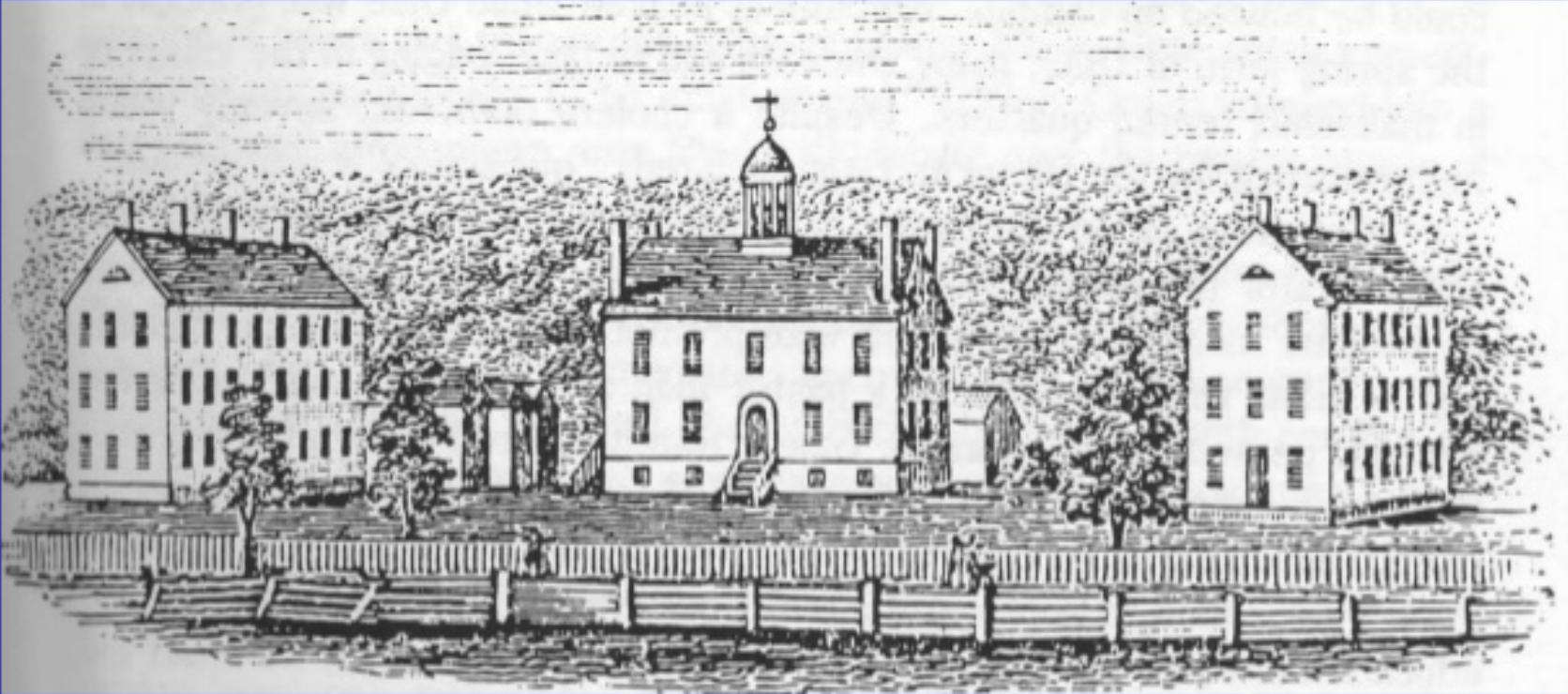
Oneida Institute, Whitesboro, New York

In 1835, Garnet enrolled at the new Noyes Academy in Canaan, New Hampshire, but anti-abolitionists soon destroyed the school building and forced the Negro students out of town. He completed his education at the Oneida Institute in Whitesboro, New York, which had recently begun admitting all races. He was acclaimed for his wit, brilliance, and rhetorical skills. The year after graduation in 1839, he injured his knee playing sports. It never fully healed, (Note: Garnet reportedly had white swelling of his diseased leg that became symptomatic during Garnet's teenage years, most likely as a complication of tuberculous arthritis, a progressive disease that may cause predisposition to additional trauma.) and his lower leg had to be amputated in 1840 or 1841.

=== Ministry ===
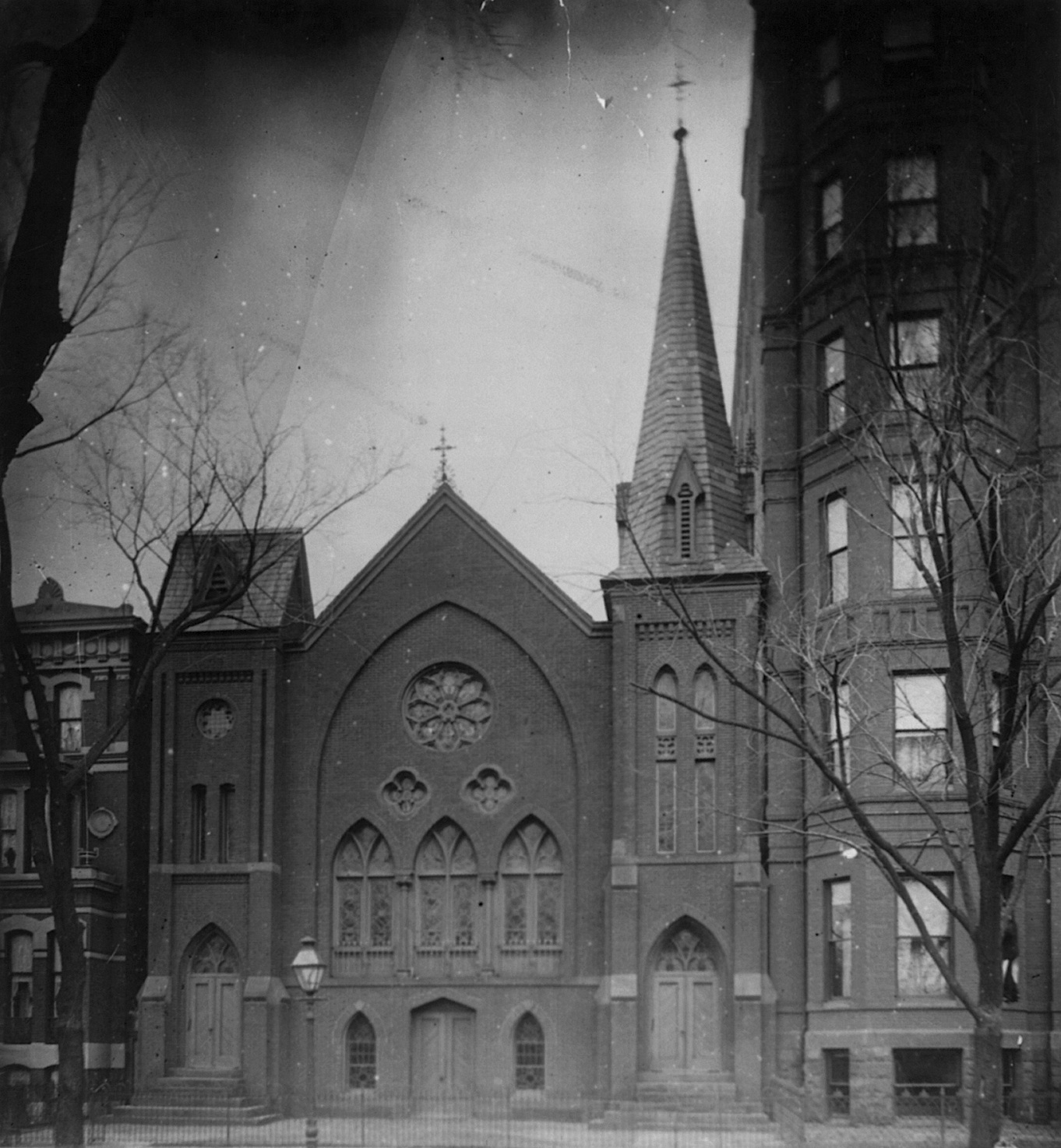
Garnet served as pastor of the Fifteenth Street Presbyterian Church in Washington, D.C., from 1864 to 1866. The church is shown here as it was in about 1899.

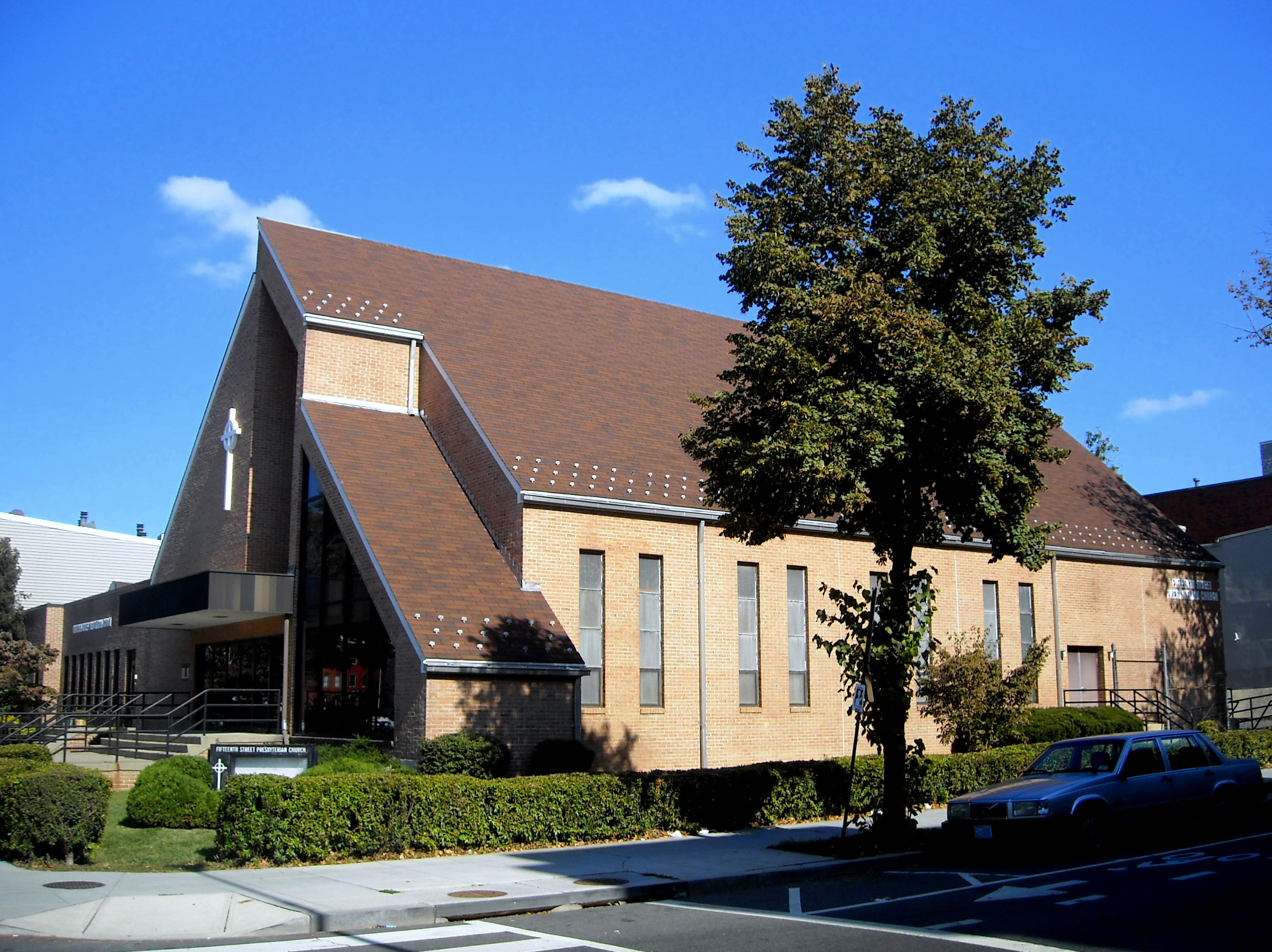
The Fifteenth Street Presbyterian Church today.

In 1839, Garnet moved with his family to Troy, New York, where he taught school and studied theology. In 1842, Garnet became pastor of the Liberty Street Presbyterian Church, a position he held for six years. With his friend William G. Allen, also an Oneida alumnus, he published the National Watchman, an abolitionist newspaper. Closely identifying with the church, Garnet supported the temperance movement and became a strong advocate of abolishing slavery.

Garnet sheltered fugitive slaves in his Liberty Street church, and philanthropist Gerrit Smith announced in his church his plan for giving grants of land to disenfranchised Black men (see Timbuctoo, New York).

He later returned to New York City, where he joined the American Anti-Slavery Society and frequently spoke at abolitionist conferences and became pastor of the First Colored Presbyterian Church, also known as Shiloh Presbyterian Church. One of his most famous speeches, "Call to Rebellion", was delivered to the 1843 National Convention of Colored Citizens, in Buffalo, New York. "Upon the conclusion of the Negro national convention of 1843, Garnet led a state convention of Negroes assembled in Rochester".

These conventions by black activists were called to work for abolition and equal rights. Garnet said that slaves should act for themselves to achieve total emancipation. He promoted an armed rebellion as the most effective way to end slavery. Frederick Douglass and William Lloyd Garrison, along with many other abolitionists both black and white, thought that Garnet's ideas were too radical and could damage the cause by arousing too much fear and resistance among whites.

In 1848 Garnet relocated from Troy to Peterboro, New York, home of the great abolition activist Gerrit Smith. Garnet supported Smith's Liberty Party, a reform party that was eventually absorbed into the Republican Party.

=== Anti-slavery role ===
Women's participation in the abolitionist movement was controversial and resulted in a split in the American Anti-Slavery Society. Arthur Tappan, Lewis Tappan, "and a group of Black ministers, including Henry Highland Garnet" founded the American and Foreign Anti-Slavery Society (AFAS). It "was committed to political abolitionism and to male leadership at the top levels."

On August 17, 1843, at the 1843 National Convention of Colored Citizens in Buffalo, New York, Garnet proposed that the meeting issue an address directly to enslaved people in the South. In his address, he advocated for a "general strike" among enslaved people, advocating for rebellion against their masters by refusing to partake in work until freedom from slavery and compensation for their labor had been granted.

We do not advise you to attempt a revolution with the sword, because it would be inexpedient. Your numbers are too small, and moreover the rising spirit of the age, and the spirit of the gospel, are opposed to war and bloodshed. But from this moment cease to labor for tyrants who will not remunerate you. Let every slave throughout the land do this, and the days of slavery are numbered. You cannot be more oppressed than you have been—you cannot suffer greater cruelties than you have already. Rather die freemen than live to be slaves. Remember that you are THREE MILLIONS!

— Henry Highland Garnet, An Address to the Slaves of the United States of America

Stanley Harrold describes a split between ideological factions within the Liberty Party, including those who supported Smith and Garrison's more moderate ideas of non-violent abolitionism. As a result of their "considerable influence" over the convention, Garnet's speech was not accepted by the greater body, and ultimately went unpublished until 1848. The address marked the rise of a new, more "aggressive" form of abolitionism, which proposed that enslaved people take direct action to destroy the institution of slavery.

Frederick Douglass, who was present at the convention, rallied the opposition against the adoption of Garnet's address. He advocated for the continuation of non-violent means of abolition, and criticized the speech for being too aggressive. His advocacy against Garnet's address contributed to its defeat, initially by one vote, and later by a greater margin. Despite his initial opposition to Garnet's ideas, Douglass acknowledged the "principle of violence to free the slave" by 1849.

By 1849, Garnet began to support emigration of blacks to Mexico, Liberia, or Haiti, where he thought they would have more opportunities. In support of this, he founded the African Civilization Society. Similar to the British African Aid Society, it sought to establish a West African colony in Yorubaland (part of present-day Nigeria). Garnet advocated a kind of Black nationalism in the United States, which included establishing Black colonies in the sparsely-inhabited Western territories. Other prominent members of this movement included minister Daniel Payne, J. Sella Martin, Rufus L. Perry, Henry M. Wilson, and Amos Noë Freeman.

In 1850, Garnet went to Great Britain at the invitation of Anna Richardson of the free produce movement, which opposed slavery by rejecting the use of products produced by slave labor. He was a popular lecturer, and spent two and a half years lecturing. At first, the work separated Garnet from his family, who remained back in New York State. While Garnet was abroad, his seven-year-old son, James Crummell Garnet, died on March 1, 1851. His wife Julia, his young son Henry, and their adopted daughter Stella Weims joined Garnet in Great Britain later that year.

In 1852, Garnet was sent to Kingston, Jamaica, as a missionary for the United Presbyterian Church of Scotland. He and his family spent three years there; his wife Julia Garnet led an industrial school for girls. After Garnet developed health problems, he and his family returned to the United States in 1855.

After John Brown's raid on Harpers Ferry in 1859, Garnet in a sermon "declared [it] to be the duty of every man who loved the cause of freedom to declare that the Harper's Ferry movement was right, and that any one who would not say so boldly had much better say nothing at all." He was described as "friend and admirer" of "the heroic John Brown".

In 1859 Garnet was president of the African Civilization Society, whose declared goal was "to engage in the great work of christianizing and civilizing Africa". When the Civil War started, Garnet's hopes ended for emigration as a solution for American Blacks. In the three-day New York draft riots of July 1863, mobs attacked Blacks and Black-owned buildings. Garnet and his family escaped attack because his daughter quickly chopped their nameplate off their door before the mobs found them. He organized a committee for sick soldiers and served as almoner to the New York Benevolent Society for victims of the mob.

In 1861, Garnet secured a U.S. passport from Secretary of State William H. Seward that declared Garnet "a citizen of the United States," a precedent that advanced claims for equal citizenship during the Civil War and Reconstruction.

When the federal government approved creating Black units, Garnet helped with recruiting United States Colored Troops. He moved with his family to Washington, DC, so that he could support the black soldiers and the war effort. He preached to many of them while serving as pastor of the prominent Liberty (Fifteenth) Street Presbyterian Church from 1864 until 1866. During this time, Garnet was the first Black minister to preach to the US House of Representatives, addressing them on February 12, 1865, about the end of slavery, on occasion of the passage of the Thirteenth Amendment.

=== Later life ===
After the war in 1868, Garnet was appointed president of Avery College in Pittsburgh, Pennsylvania. Later he returned to New York City as a pastor at the Shiloh Presbyterian Church (formerly the First Colored Presbyterian Church, and now St. James Presbyterian Church in Harlem).

He remained politically active upon his return to New York, and was known to provide support to the Cuban independence movement. In 1878, while living at 102 West 3rd Street, in a neighborhood often referred to as Little Africa, Garnet hosted a reception for Cuban revolutionary leader Antonio Maceo.

His first wife, Julia Williams, died at their home in Allegheny City, Pennsylvania, on January 7, 1870. In 1875, Garnet married Sarah Smith Tompkins, who was a New York teacher and school principal, suffragist, and community organizer.

=== Ambassador to Liberia ===
Garnet's last wish was to go, even for a few weeks, to Liberia, where his daughter Mary Garnet Barboza resided, and to die there. He was appointed as the U.S. Minister (ambassador) to Liberia, where he arrived on December 28, 1881, and died the following February 13 of malaria. Garnet was given a state funeral by the Liberian government. As described by Alexander Crummell:

[T]hey buried him like a prince, this princely man, with the blood of a long line of chieftains in his veins, in the soil of his fathers. The entire military forces of the capital of the republic turned out to render a last tribute of respect and honor. The President and his cabinet, the ministry of every name, the president, professors and students of the college, large bodies of citizens from the river settlement, as well as the townsmen, attended his obsequies as mourners. A noble tribute was accorded him by Rev. E. W. Blyden, D. D., LL. D., one of the finest scholars and thinkers in the nation. Minute guns were fired at every footfall of the solemn procession.

He was buried at Palm Grove Cemetery in Monrovia.

Frederick Douglass, who had not been on speaking terms with Garnet for many years because of their differences, still mourned Garnet's passing and noted his achievements.

== Personal life ==
In 1841, Garnet married Julia Ward Williams, whom he had met as a fellow student at the Noyes Academy. She had also completed her education at the Oneida Institute. Together they had three children, only one of whom survived to adulthood. Their adopted daughter, Stella, died of yellow fever in Jamaica and was buried there. The rest, while sickened, boarded a ship for America.

== Legacy and honors ==
- 1952, Garnet's portrait was included among those in Civil Rights Bill Passes, 1866, a mural painted in the Hall of Capitols, the Cox Corridors of the Capitol building in Washington, D.C. It was painted by Allyn Cox.
- P.S. 175 or the Henry Highland Garnet School for Success in Harlem, as well as the Henry Highland Garnet Elementary School in Chestertown, Maryland, are named for him.
- In 2002, scholar Molefi Kete Asante listed Henry Highland Garnet on his list of 100 Greatest African Americans.
- The Garnet School at 10th Street and U Avenue, N.W., in Washington, D.C., was named in his honor in 1880. It was merged with the Patterson school in a new building erected in 1929 and renamed Shaw Middle School at Garnet-Patterson. It was closed in 2013.
- Garnet High School, Charleston, West Virginia, was named for him from 1900 until 1956 when it closed with desegregation. The building served as John Adams Junior High until 1969 when a new John Adams school was built. Garnet's name was restored as the Garnet Adult Education Center and is now Garnet Career Center.
- Garnet is included on a New Hampshire historical marker (number 246) commemorating Noyes Academy in Canaan.

== See also ==
- List of African-American abolitionists

== Notes ==
Government offices
Preceded by John H. Smythe	United States Minister to Liberia; June 30, 1881 – February 13, 1882	Succeeded by John H. Smythe
