= Siloam Historic District =

Historic district in Georgia, United States

- U.S. National Register of Historic Places
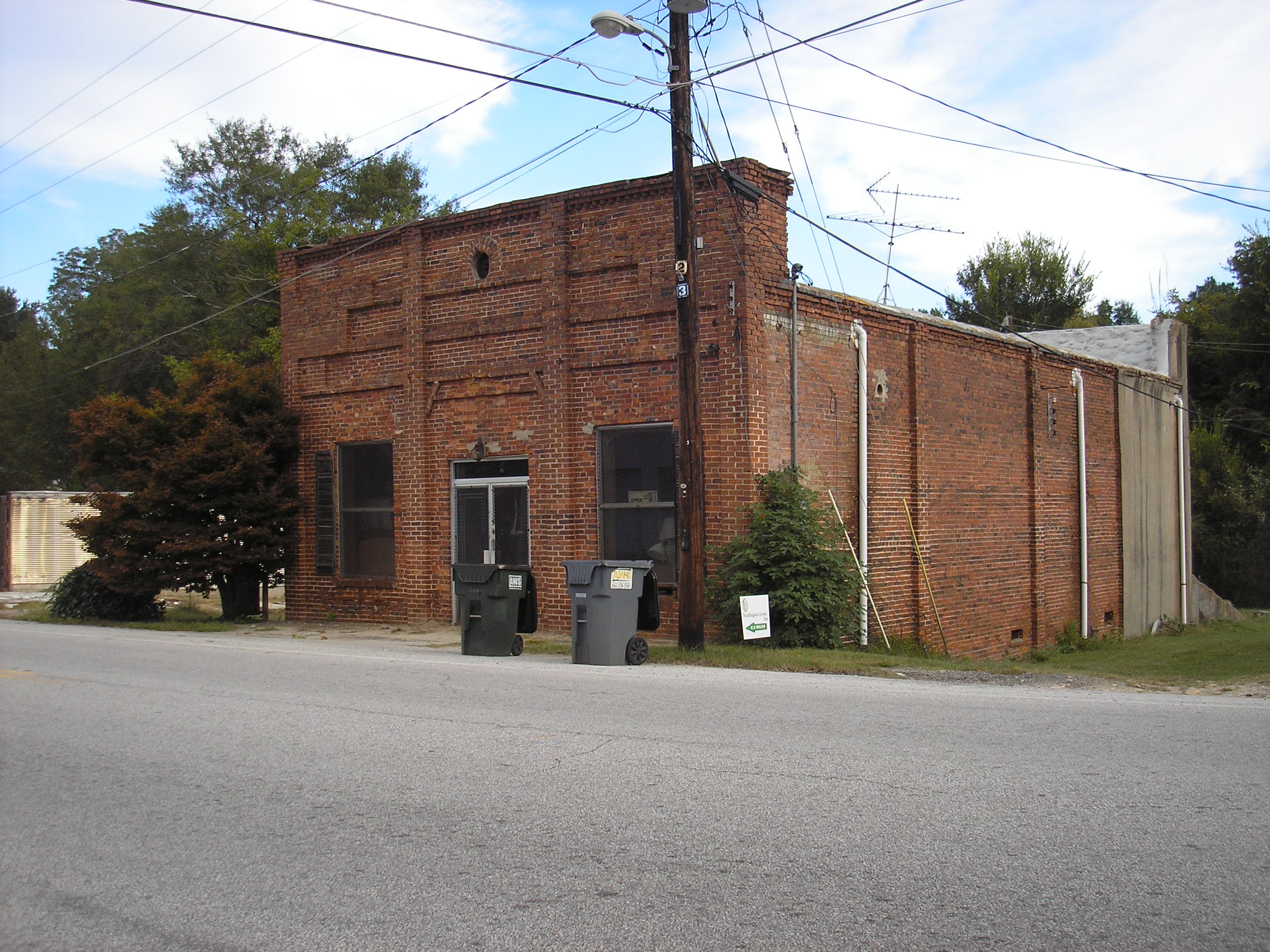

- Location within Georgia
- Location: Roughly centered on Main St., Union Point Hwy., and Church St., Siloam, Georgia
- Coordinates: 33°32′05″N 83°04′55″W
- Area: 100 acres (40 ha)
- Built: 1878
- Architectural style: Italianate, Queen Anne, et al
- NRHP reference No.: 01000740
- Added to NRHP: July 26, 2001

The Siloam Historic District, in Siloam, Georgia, USA, is a 100 acres (40 ha) historic district which was listed on the National Register of Historic Places in 2001. The listing included 40 contributing buildings, a contributing structure, and a contributing site.

The district is a very irregular area roughly centered on Main St. (Georgia Route 15), Union Point Highway (Georgia Route 77) and Church St., within the city's essentially circular area.

Among other properties, it includes the Siloam City Cemetery, the Siloam Baptist Church, and the Siloam Presbyterian Church.
