= Anna Richardson (abolitionist) =

British Quaker slavery abolitionist

Anna Richardson (née Atkins; 5 January 1806 – 27 March 1892) was an English Quaker slavery abolitionist and peace campaigner, and a writer and editor of anti-slavery texts and journals, based in Newcastle Upon Tyne.

== Biography ==
Anna Atkins was born on 5 January 1806 in Chipping Norton, Oxfordshire to the Quaker family of Esther Atkins (née Millard) and her husband Samuel, who died in 1821. She is recorded as being educated at the Society of Friends' Ackworth School in West Yorkshire between 1817 and 1819. In 1833 she married a fellow pupil of the school, Henry Richardson, a grocer of Quaker stock, and settled with him in Newcastle. Childless, both pursued social causes of the time, notably the promulgation of religion, education of the poor, abolition, temperance and peace campaigning.

Both Richardsons attended the International Peace Congress in Paris in 1849, and Anna worked to further Elihu Burritt's League of Universal Brotherhood by her involvement in Olive Leaf peace groups; from 1844 to 1857 she edited a magazine aimed at children, The Olive Leaf.

Richardson is recognised as a leader of the free produce movement in the UK, which encouraged a boycott of goods produced as a result of slave labour, forming the Newcastle Ladies' Free Produce Association in 1846. She encouraged other Quaker groups to establish similar associations, including sponsoring an 1850 speaking tour by Henry Highland Garnet to England, Scotland and Ireland, which led to at least 26 groups forming by the end of that year. Richardson used her literary and organisational skills to edit and publish a journal, The Slave, as the magazine of the free produce movement, from 1851 to 1854. She also produced a monthly Illustrations of American slavery, in effect press releases feeding local papers with anti-slavery stories. One of her tracts, Little Laura, the Kentucky Abolitionist, is identified by De Rosa as being aimed at children, but with a view to encouraging them to action, including "consulting with their parents and ... collect[ing] financial donations". Anna and her sister-in-law Ellen fund-raised on their own account, and are remembered for purchasing for £150 the freedom of escaped slave and African-American social reformer Frederick Douglass on 5 December 1846.

Richardson was active at a local level, involving herself in Bible Societies and missions aimed at the working population of Newcastle. She served as a prison visitor, worked to aid refugees, and supported the temperance movement by establishing teetotal refreshment rooms with her husband. She died on 27 March 1892 and is buried Elswick cemetery. Her Oxford Dictionary of National Biography entry esteems her as "a serious and religious woman, with a lifelong commitment to philanthropy and reform, and considerable organizational abilities and leadership skills."

== Works ==
- Little Laura, the Kentucky Abolitionist (1859)
