= Harry Ashby (footballer) =

English footballer

Personal information
- Full name: Henry Radford Ashby
- Date of birth: 1875
- Place of birth: Derby, England
- Date of death: 1926 (aged 50–51)
- Position: Full back

Senior career*
Years	Team	Apps	(Gls)
- Derby Athletic
1896–1898	Burton Swifts	88	(6)
1898–1900	Brighton United		
1901–1904	Burton United	92	(0)
1904–1905	Plymouth Argyle	40	(0)
1905–1907	Leicester Fosse	66	(0)
- * Club domestic league appearances and goals

Henry Radford Ashby (1875 – 1926) was an English footballer who played in the Football League for Burton Swifts, Burton United and Leicester Fosse, and the Southern League for Plymouth Argyle. He was a full back.

== Life and career ==
Ashby was born in Derby. He began his career with Derby Athletic and in 1896 joined Burton Swifts, where he made 88 league appearances over the next two seasons. Ashby moved on to Brighton United in 1898. He spent nearly two seasons there before the club experienced financial difficulties, released their players and were dissolved. Ashby joined Burton United in 1901, an amalgamation of the Swifts and Burton Wanderers, and played in 92 league matches over the next three seasons.

He moved to Plymouth Argyle in 1904, where he made 41 appearances in all competitions and received a Western League winners medal in his one season with the club. A club handbook describes Ashby as "a player who has had a good reputation among second leaguers for several seasons." He joined Leicester Fosse in 1905 for an £80 transfer fee. He spent two seasons with the club and made 68 appearances in all competitions before ending his playing career. Ashby died in 1926.

== Honours ==
- Western League First Division: 1904–05
