= Henry Ashby (paediatrician) =

English paediatrician

Henry Ashby (1846–1908) was an English paediatrician. A graduate of the University of London in the 1870s, in 1875 he was appointed demonstrator of anatomy and physiology in the Liverpool School of Medicine and served as assistant physician to the Liverpool Infirmary for Children. In 1878 he became a physician in the Manchester Hospital for Diseases of Children. From 1880 to 1882 he was an evening lecturer on animal physiology at Owens College, and lectured on children's diseases at Owens College and then at Victoria University until his death in 1908.
