= Rufus L. Perry =

American educator, journalist, and minister

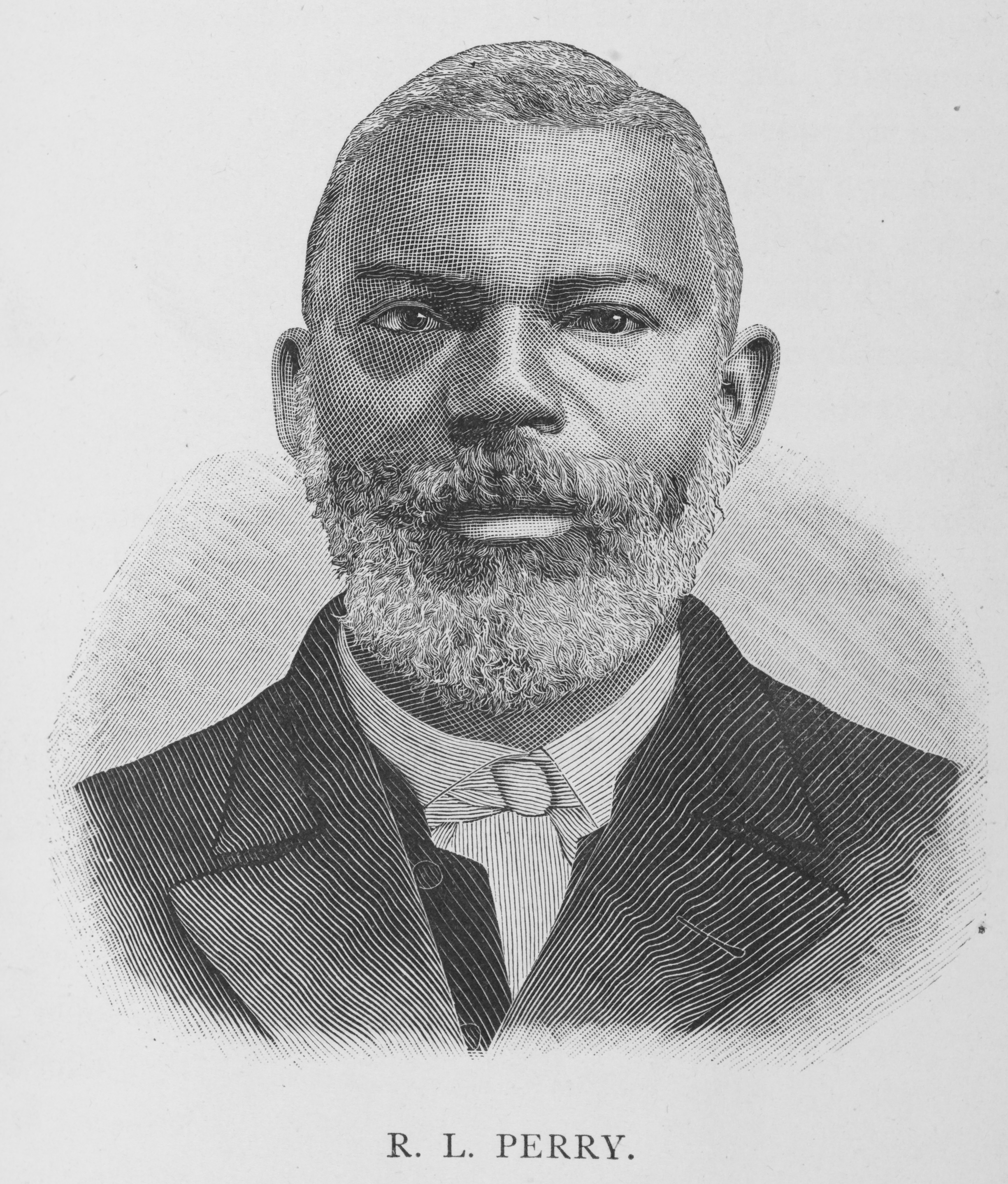
- Perry in 1887
- Born: March 11, 1834; Smith County, Tennessee
- Died: June 18, 1895 (aged 61); Brooklyn, New York, United States
- Education: Kalamazoo Seminary, Simmons College of Kentucky, Wilberforce University
- Occupations: Educator, journalist, minister
- Political party: Republican

Religious life
- Religion: Baptist

Rufus L. Perry (March 11, 1834 - June 18, 1895) was an American educator, journalist, and Baptist minister from Brooklyn, New York. He was a prominent member of the African Civilization Society and was a co-founder of the Howard Colored Orphan Asylum, which developed from it. He was the editor of numerous newspapers and journals, most notably the National Monitor. He was a prominent Baptist, and in 1886 he founded the Messiah Baptist Church, where he was pastor until his death. He was also a classical scholar. He protested segregation at William E. Sinn's Park Theatre in New York City.

== Early life ==
Rufus Lewis Perry was born a slave on a plantation in Smith County, Tennessee on March 11, 1834 to Lewis Perry and Maria. The family was owned by Archibald W. Overton.

Lewis was a talented mechanic, carpenter, and cabinet maker, and secured the means to bring his family to Nashville where the Rufus was able to attend the school for free blacks taught by Sally Porter. Lewis escaped to Canada when Rufus was seven years old, and Rufus was brought back to the plantation where his education gave him the reputation of being "dangerous". In August 1852 he was sold to a trader to be taken to Mississippi. However, Perry was able to forge a pass and after three weeks himself fled to Windsor, Ontario, Canada.

In 1854, Perry converted to the Baptist religion and soon after enrolled in the Kalamazoo Theological Seminary in Kalamazoo, Michigan where he graduated in 1861. On or about October 9, 1861 he was ordained pastor of the Second Baptist Church at Ann Arbor, Michigan. He later became a pastor in St. Catharines, Ontario, and Buffalo, New York.

== African Civilization Society ==
In 1862, Perry and Rev Henry M. Wilson formed the Colored Orphan Asylum of the African Civilization Society for the education and development of African Americans. The organization promoted schools throughout the country and founded the Asylum at Weeksville, Brooklyn. Other prominent members included Daniel Payne, Henry Highland Garnet, Rev J. Sella Martin, and Amos N. Freeman. In 1869, Perry was general agent, superintendent of schools, and editor of the newspaper, and chairman of the building committee of the Society. The group fractured, and that year three officers, president Amos Freeman, director John Flamer, and Perry brought a lawsuit against corresponding secretary Rev. Henry M. Wilson, which was not successful. The Society closed in 1871, but the orphan asylum, later known as the Howard Colored Orphan Asylum, persisted and Perry served as its president into the 1880s.

== Journalist and community leader ==
Perry was a prominent member of the Weeksville neighborhood and became a leader in the Baptist church and a well known journalist. In his career, he was editor of the Sunbeam an illustrated children's paper, coordinate editor of the American Baptist, editor of the People's Journal, and publisher of the National Monitor. From about 1877 to 1887 he was corresponding secretary of the Consolidated American Baptist Missionary Convention and in 1887 was corresponding secretary of the American Educational Association and of the American Baptist Free Mission Society. In 1891 he was elected president of the New England Baptist Missionary Convention.

In 1883, when the Brooklyn Public Schools Board of Education contemplated closing the schools for African American children, Perry, Charles A. Dorsey, and Rev. William T. Dixon led the fight to keep the schools open. In 1886, he organized the Messiah Baptist Church in Brooklyn. His congregation included a number of prominent Brooklynites, including Phillip A. White, T. McCants Stewart, Charles A. Dorsey, John Q. Allen, Charles H. Lansing Jr. and W. H. Johnson.

He was also a scholar of classical ethnology and read Hebrew, Greek, and Latin. In 1887 he wrote a text, The Cushite, or the Children of Ham as seen by the Ancient Historians and Poets, which he published as a book in 1893 under the title, The Cushite, Or, The Descendants of Ham: As Found in the Sacred Scriptures and in the Writings of Ancient Historians and Poets from Noah to the Christian Era. This work traces the history of black people to a "glorious past". In that way, his work fits in a literature which attempts to disassociate nobility or goodness with whiteness. The introduction for the book was written by T. McCants Stewart.

In 1888, Perry was elected president of a national meeting of Baptists, which came to be a union meeting of the General Association of Western States and Territories, the Foreign Mission Convention of the United States and the American Baptist Missionary Union, with Charles H. Parrish Secretary. A major theme of the conventions was unity of African American Baptists and the consolidation of a number of bodies such as the Colored Missionary Associations and the Co-operation of the American Baptist Missionary Union.

In 1892, Perry was among a delegation of African Americans to visit president Benjamin Harrison, who was campaigning for reelection against Grover Cleveland (Cleveland would win the election). After the meeting, Perry declared himself unsatisfied with Harrison, who was a fellow Republican, because Harrison was not satisfactorily active in putting an end to violence against blacks in the South. Perry noted he was a lifelong Republican and would support other Republicans on the ticket.

== Educational honors ==
Perry was awarded a PhD in theology from Kalamazoo Seminary, and received two honorary degrees. He was granted an honorary Doctor of Philosophy on May 17, 1887 by Simmons College of Kentucky, the day after delivering a commencement lecture and a doctorate of divinity by Wilberforce University in 1888.

== Family ==
Perry married Charlott Perry. They had eight children, Edity, Rufus L. Jr, Arthur, Latha, Eudha, Minnie, David, and Hattie B. Perry's son, Rufus Perry, was legal partner of J. Douglas Wetmore.

On Sunday, June 16, 1895, Perry fell into a coma from complication of diseases. He died at his home on the evening of June 18. His funeral was held at Concord Baptist Church in Brooklyn and his burial was in Cypress Hills Cemetery. The pall bearers were Dr. Amos Harper, T. McCants Stewart, T. Thomas Fortune, Dr. Daniel W. Wisher, Dr. T. Dwight Miller, and Dr. R. Watkins, and Rev W. F. Dixon delivered the eulogy.

== Bibliography ==
- Perry, Rufus Lewis. The Cushite, Or, The Descendants of Ham: As Found in the Sacred Scriptures and in the Writings of Ancient Historians and Poets from Noah to the Christian Era. Willey & Company, 1893.
