= John Godfrey (disambiguation) =

John Godfrey (1942–2023), Canadian cabinet minister.

John Godfrey is also the name of:

- John Godfrey (American football) (1921–2008), American football coach, head football coach at Whitter College (1960–1979)
- John Godfrey (composer), British composer and performer
- John Godfrey (cricketer) (1917–1995), English cricketer
- John Godfrey (diplomat), counterterrorism official and U.S. ambassador to Sudan
- John Abram Godfrey (1833–1877), U.S. State Department Consul, politician and attorney
- John F. Godfrey (1839–1885), sailor, soldier and city attorney of Los Angeles, California
- John Henry Godfrey (1888–1970), head of British Department of Naval Intelligence during World War II and later head of the Royal Indian Navy
- John Morrow Godfrey (1912–2001), Canadian pilot, lawyer and senator
- John Ray Godfrey (1944–2024), American basketball player
- John T. Godfrey (1922–1958), American fighter pilot
