= Weeksville Heritage Center =

Historic district in Brooklyn, New York

- Hunterfly Road Historic District
- U.S. National Register of Historic Places
- U.S. Historic district
- New York City Landmark
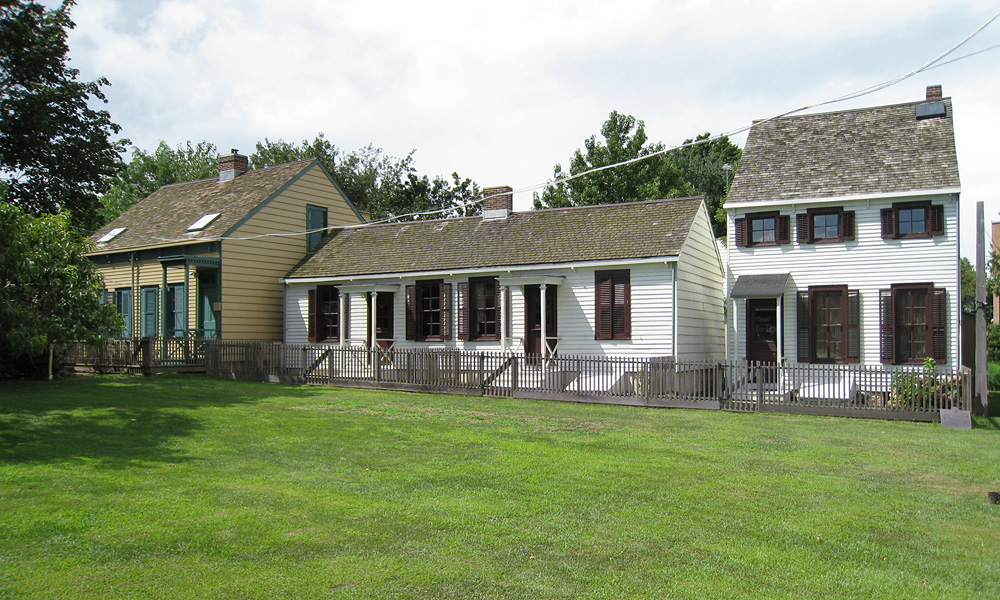
- Hunterfly Road House, August 2009

- Location within New York City Location within New York Location within the United States
- Location: 1698, 1700, 1702, 1704, 1706, 1708 Bergen St., Brooklyn, New York, US
- Coordinates: 40°40′26″N 73°55′31″W
- Area: 2 acres (0.81 ha)
- Built: 1830
- NRHP reference No.: 72000853
- NYCL No.: 0729–0733, 0769

Significant dates
- Added to NRHP: December 5, 1972
- Designated NYCL: August 18, 1970

The Weeksville Heritage Center is a historic site on Buffalo Avenue between St. Marks Avenue and Bergen Street in Crown Heights, Brooklyn, New York City. It is dedicated to the preservation of Weeksville, one of America's first free black communities during the 19th century. Within this community, the residents established schools, churches and benevolent associations and were active in the abolitionist movement. Weeksville is a historic settlement of national significance and one of the few remaining historical sites of pre-Civil War African-American communities.

Founding members of the preservation group were James Hurley, Dewey Harley, Dolores McCullough, Joan Maynard, and Patricia Johnson. It was founded as the Society for the Preservation of Weeksville and Bedford Stuyvesant in 1970, and then the Weeksville Heritage Center. The Heritage Center focuses on tours, arts and crafts, literacy and historical preservation programs for public-school students. The site is managed by the Weeksville Society, a historical society that maintains the 12,400-square-foot (1,150 m^{2}) site comprising the historic Hunterfly Houses and an open grassy area.

== Exhibits ==
The museum's main exhibit is the Hunterfly Road Historic District, a national historic district. It consists of four contributing residential buildings, erected no earlier than the 1860s, within the 19th-century free Black community of Weeksville. They were built along a road dating to American Indian tenure of the area; it led to shellfish beds at the Jamaica Bay end of Fresh Kill/Creek. The city began to close sections of Hunterfly Road after 1835. The houses include an 1860s single-story double-house, a 1900s two-story wood-framed house, and the home of a family who lived there from 1923 to 1968.

In 1970 the houses were declared New York City Landmarks, and in 1972 they were listed on the National Register of Historic Places as the Hunterfly Road Historic District.

== History ==
=== Context ===
In 1838, James Weeks, an African American, bought a plot of land from Henry C. Thompson (another free African American) in the Ninth Ward of central Brooklyn. This was 11 years after the final abolition of slavery in New York State, which had followed a gradual program from early in the nineteenth century. This site was called Weeksville after him.

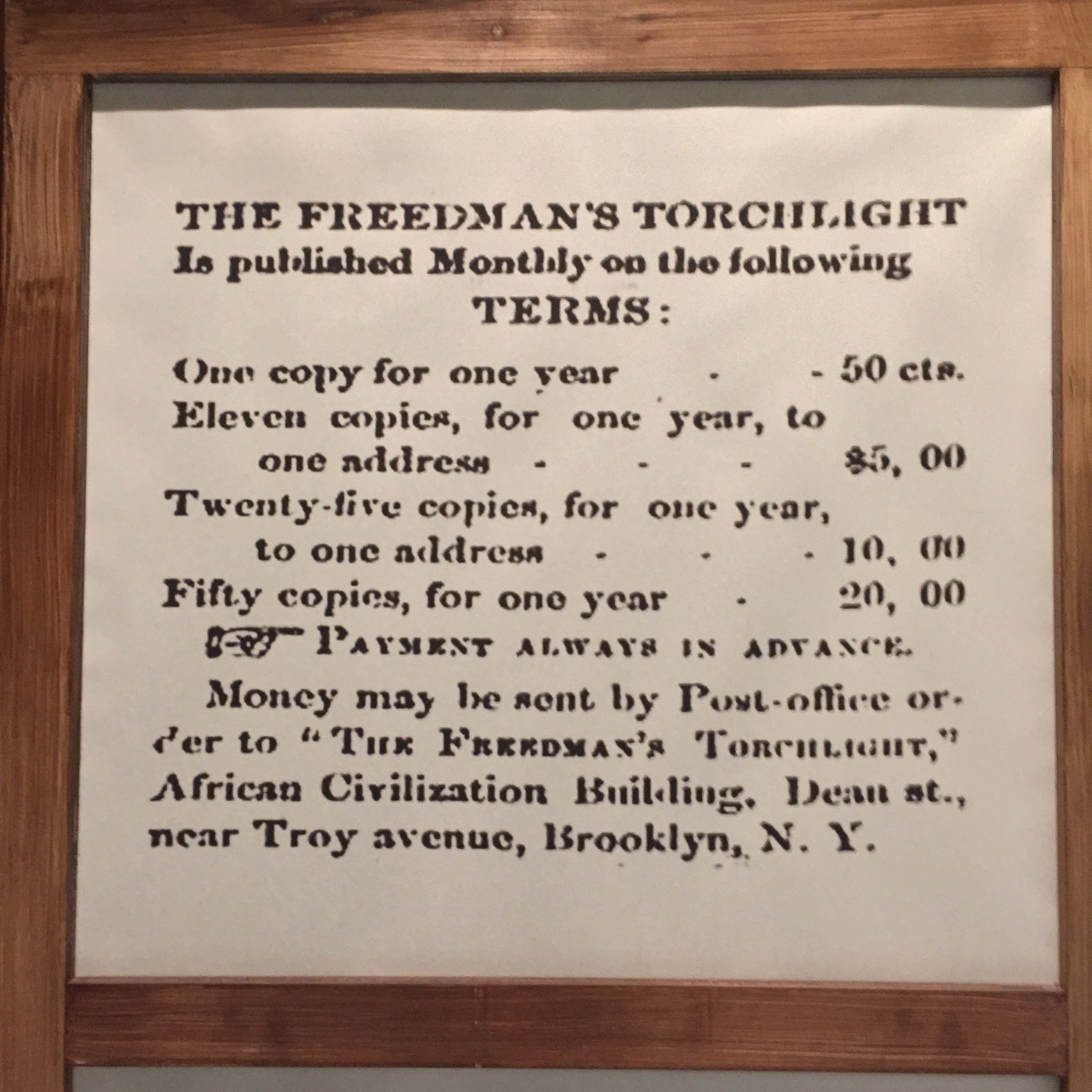
Image from exhibit at Weeksville Heritage Center about the newspaper publication, The Freedman's Torchlight, published by the African Civilization Society

A 1906 article in The New York Age, recalling an earlier period, said that James Weeks, a stevedore and a respected member of the community, "owned a handsome dwelling at Schenectady and Atlantic Avenues." Weeksville became home to ministers, teachers and other professionals, including the first female African-American physician in New York state, and the first African-American police officer in New York City. The black community in Weeksville developed its own churches, a school, a baseball team, an orphanage, a cemetery, an old age home, an African-American benevolent society, and one of the first African-American newspapers, the Freedman's Torchlight. During the violent New York Draft Riots of 1863, during the Civil War, the community served as a refuge for many African Americans who fled from Manhattan; many resettled in Brooklyn.

=== Rediscovery and opening ===
Weeksville was rediscovered in 1968. The search for Historic Weeksville began in 1968 in a Pratt Neighborhood College workshop on Brooklyn and New York City neighborhoods led by James Hurley. Dolores McCullough and Patricia Johnson, two students in the workshop, became active and important contributors to the Weeksville Project. Hurley first read about Weeksville in the book, Brooklyn's Eastern District, by local historian, Eugene Armbruster. Hurley, a local resident, researcher, and former aerial photographer, and Joseph Haynes, a professional engineer, pilot, and long-term resident of Bedford–Stuyvesant, later reconnoitered and photographed the historic houses on Hunterfly Road during an airplane flight over the area. Hurley and Haynes had originally met at the Brooklyn Children's Museum. They had collaborated on creating a walking tour of the area that was sponsored by the Museum of the City of New York. The old lane, located off Bergen Street between Buffalo and Rochester avenues, was a remnant of the colonial Hunterfly Road. Hunterfly Road was at the eastern edge of the 19th-century Weeksville settlement.

After the rediscovery, Hurley learned that a block of houses bounded by Troy Avenue, Pacific Street, Schenectady Avenue, and Dean Street were about to be cleared to build new city housing under the Model Cities Program. He was able to initiate an archeological survey under the aegis of the Bedford-Stuyvesant Youth in Action anti-poverty program. Summer interns of the Neighborhood Youth Corps were employed by what was initially called the Weeksville Project to explore the block as demolition of the houses occurred. The archeological site was developed for the present-day Weeksville Gardens Houses, which belong to the New York City Housing Authority.

Residents gradually developed the Weeksville Project as a legally incorporated entity, The Society for the Preservation of Weeksville and Bedford-Stuyvesant History, generally known as The Weeksville Society.

The Society purchased the Hunterfly Road houses in 1973. The houses were rehabilitated in the 1980s, and again after vandalism in the 1990s. One of the houses burned down in a fire in the 1990s. In 2005, following a $3 million restoration, the houses reopened to the public as the Weeksville Heritage Center. Each house showcases a different era of Weeksville history.

=== Expansion of Heritage Center ===
Entrance to Heritage Center, fall 2026

The Heritage Center was completed in 2013 and features a $14 million 19,000-square-foot (1,800 m^{2}) performance and educational program space, including a café and library. It was almost entirely financed with city money, and extends Weeksville's offering to a broader spectrum of the community. The Heritage Center aspires to increase the number of visitors from the roughly 7,500 who visit annually to about 50,000. Caples Jefferson Architects designed a new museum building that opened in 2014.

Inside Weeksville Heritage Center, fall 2026

In 2019, the center launched an emergency crowdfunding campaign due to budget shortfalls. The Center asked that donors give at least $200,000 until the city could allot funds; it ultimately received $350,000. That June, the city announced that the center would become part of the city's Cultural Institutions Group, becoming the first new addition to that group in over 20 years, and the first black cultural center in Brooklyn to be so named. The designation allows the center to receive significant capital to fund operating costs from the Department of Cultural Affairs. Weeksville Heritage Center used the funding to preserve additional artifacts.

Hunterfly Road houses at Weeksville Heritage Center after 2024-2026 renovation (November 2026)

In late 2024, work commenced on a $4 million project to renovate the Hunterfly Road houses. This project was completed in March 2026 and included mechanical upgrades and exterior repairs. Shortly before the renovation was completed, the Weeksville Heritage Center received $1 million in state funds to help maintain the houses.

== See also ==
- African Civilization Society
- African-American historic places
- List of New York City Designated Landmarks in Brooklyn
- National Register of Historic Places listings in Brooklyn
