= John Abram Godfrey =

American lawyer

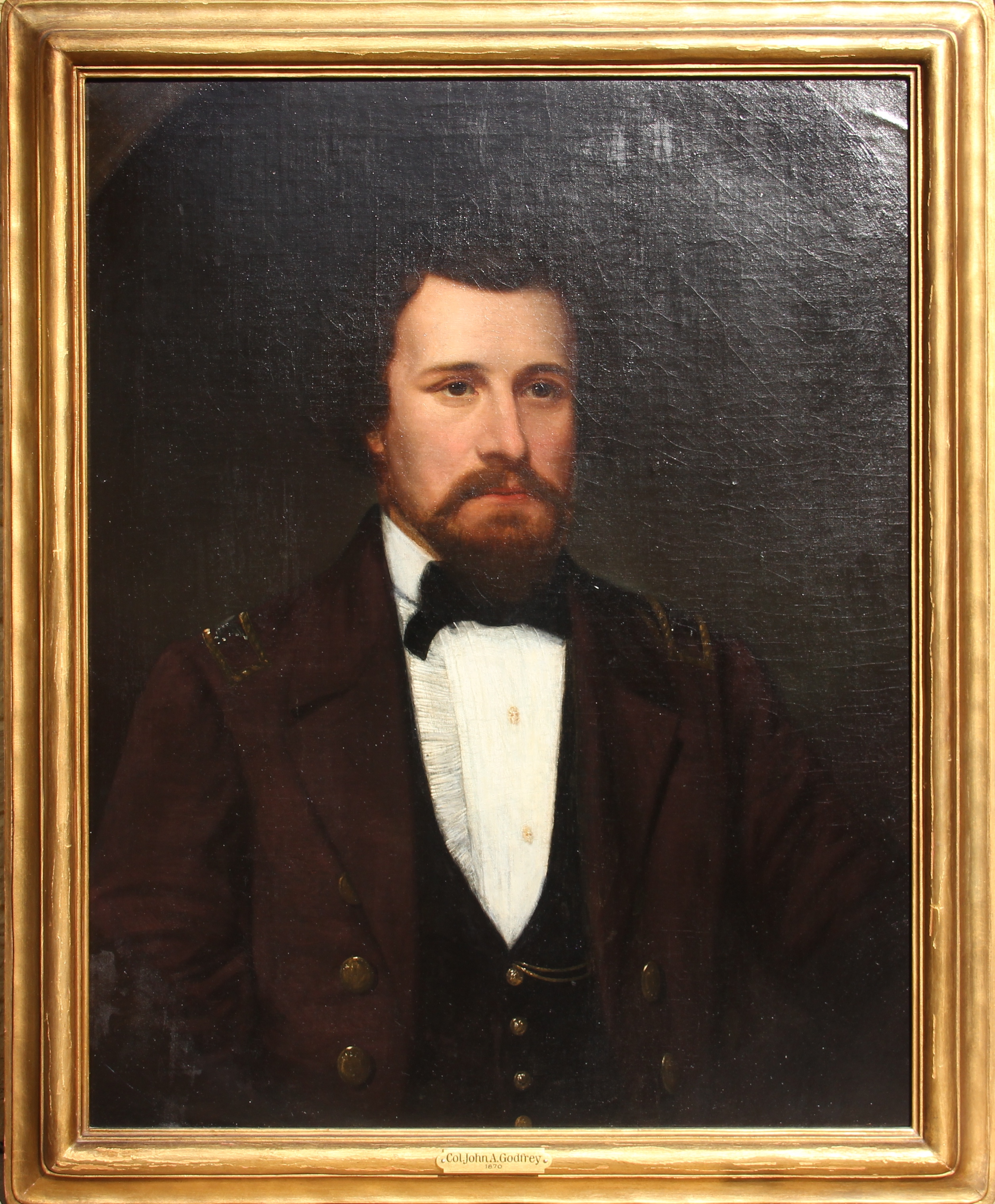
John Abram Godfrey

John Abram Godfrey (25 October 1833 - 7 March 1877) was a U.S. State Department Consul, politician and attorney.

As a young man, he was a member of the bar in California, serving as assistant to Samuel Williams Inge, U.S. District Attorney for the Northern District of California beginning in October 1853. He continued to work for Mr Inge through August 1856, litigating the real estate claims of Mexican land grants to Joseph Yves Limantour.

President Franklin Pierce officially appointed John A Godfrey U.S. Consul in Guaymas, Mexico on June 16, 1856. The United States Ambassador to Mexico at that time was James Gadsden, who had negotiated the Gadsden Purchase in 1853. A dinner was given in Gadsden's honor in Mexico City on August 2, 1856 to express Mexican appreciation for his efforts on behalf of both Mexican and American interests. John Godfrey accompanied Samuel Inge as honored guests at the event. Soon thereafter, John wrote to Secretary of State William L. Marcy from Mexico on September 16, 1856 that he was leaving for the East Coast, requesting a five month leave of absence because the interests of the United States were so limited that "his absence would not in any way affect the interests of American citizens". Guaymas, a coastal town, served at the time as a supply route for the small American population of the Southwest. Godfrey was subsequently admitted to the U.S. Court of Federal Claims in May 1856 and to the New York bar in November of that year on the motion of his brother-in-law, Judge Philip J. Joachimsen.

He spoke in opposition to the political agenda of the nascent Republican party at a large meeting at the Cooper Institute in 1860 and was elected Master of the Godfrey Lodge of the Masons in 1861. The name of this lodge was changed to the Dirigo Lodge on June 5, 1862. Godfrey returned to the Southwest in December 1863 as a hired member of a party to assess the Arizona Mining Company, then owned by a Colonel Samuel F. Butterworth. Several members of the group were killed in an attack upon them by Apache Indians

Godfrey delivered a speech in Philadelphia in 1864 on behalf of General George McClellan during the 1864 presidential campaign. His speech at that time makes it clear that he had become a Copperhead, calling for a negotiated end to the Civil War. John was not an active combatant in the Civil War. He was granted authority on October 17, 1863 by the New York State National Guard to raise a regiment but did not do so. This authority was later officially revoked on August 4, 1867.

One of his greatest pleasures throughout his life was horseback riding. In good health he was in the saddle daily. His hobbies included the assembly of collections of various sorts, the most valuable of which is a surviving book of American autographs. This collection, assembled in the years during and immediately after the Civil War, includes over two hundred original signatures including all members of Abraham Lincoln’s cabinet, most of senior Union and Confederate Generals of the Civil War, most members of the 39th United States Congress, several prominent renowned writers, poets and philosophers of the mid 19th century and four men who had been or who went on to become Presidents - James K. Polk, Millard Fillmore, James Buchanan and Rutherford B. Hayes.

His legal work in New York included large real estate conveyances in mid-town Manhattan, directorship of the Safeguard Insurance Company, NYC Commissioner of Deeds, Secretary of the New York Bar Association and litigation against Mary Todd Lincoln to collect $9,620 for capes and sables purchased from December 1864 to May 1865 from William Moser, a fur merchant located on Maiden Lane in Lower Manhattan. As an officer of the Bar Association, John Godfrey supported the system of popular election of judges by citizens rather than the legislative appointment of the judiciary.

He was designated a Major in the New York State Inspector General's Department effective 10 May 1867 and a Lieutenant Colonel in the New York State Adjutant General's Department, 2nd Brigade, 1st Division effective January 28, 1870. Godfrey was sued for $5,000 for malicious prosecution in 1871 by John E. Bendix.

Godfrey wrote an extensive amount of prose and poetry, including "An Ode to Charity;" "Cordelia A Poem in Three Cantos";"Poetical Pencillings of Leisure Hours & Selections; "An Address on the Progress of Civilization in the Nineteenth Century", and "An Ode to the Hebrew Benevolent and German Hebrew Benevolent Societies of the City of New York". He provided the legal work required to merge these societies into the Hebrew Benevolent Society of New York in 1859, working closely with his older sister Priscilla, who later became President of the Hebrew Sheltering Guardian Society's Asylum for Children, and with her husband Judge Philip J. Joachimsen, who was President of the Hebrew Benevolent Society (1855), the Hebrew Orphan Asylum (1859) and the organizer of the Hebrew Sheltering Guardian Society for Children in New York in 1879.

John Godfrey married Mary Alice Macaulay on March 26, 1868 in New York City, unofficially changing his middle name around that time from "Abram" to "Augustus". John died of pneumonia at his home in New York City on 7 March 1877 He was an associate of The Associated Pioneers, Territorial Days of California, headquartered in New York City, which conducted his funeral arrangements. John A Godfrey is buried in Cypress Hills Cemetery in Brooklyn, New York. He was survived by his wife, his seven year old son Macaulay Sutton Underhill Godfrey and five year old daughter, Lily Alys GODFREY Baker.
