= William T. Dixon =

African-American Baptist minister (1833-1909)

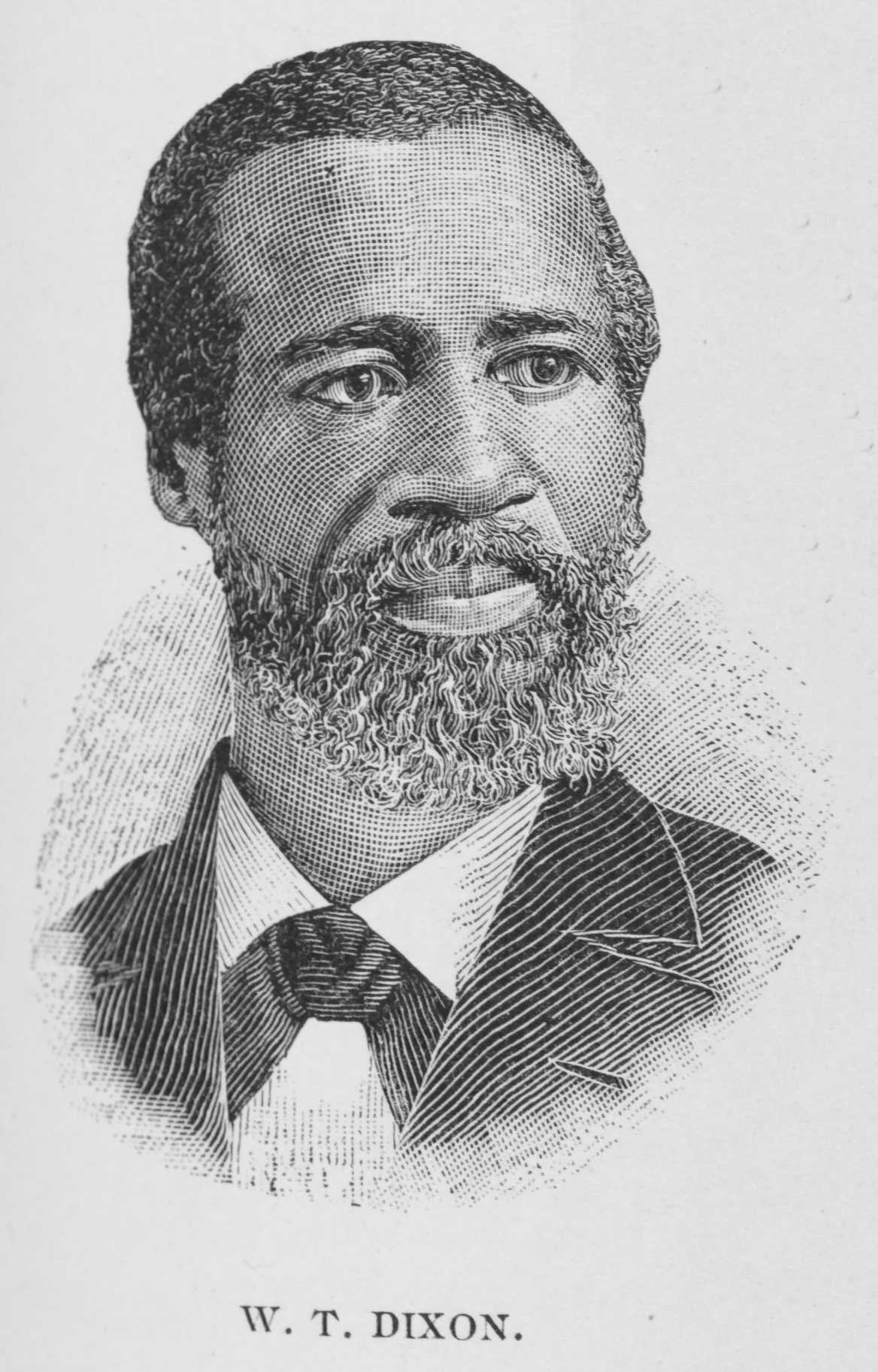
- Dixon in 1887
- Born: September 8, 1833; Manhattan, New York
- Died: June 3, 1909 (aged 75); Brooklyn, New York
- Occupation(s): Minister, educator

Religious life
- Religion: Baptist

William T. Dixon (September 8, 1833 – June 3, 1909) was an educator and Baptist minister in Brooklyn, New York. He was a founder of the New England Baptist Association. Dixon was a member of Brooklyn's black elite and was listed by the Brooklyn Daily Eagle as a member of Brooklyn's "Colored 400" in 1892.

== Early life ==
William Thomas Dixon was born in New York City on September 8, 1833 to George H. and Frances R. Dixon, both natives of Virginia. Dixon attended what was later known as Colored Grammar school No. 1 taught by John Peterson from 7 to 15 years of age. He remained at the school after that, working as an assistant. In 1851 he was baptized at the Abyssinian Baptist Church of New York by Rev. J. T. Raymond. In the late 1850s he married Matilda A. Wilson. The couple had five children, and Matilda died after nine years of marriage. He then married Angeline C. Branham of Arlington, Virginia. Dixon was survived by two children from his marriage with Angeline and two from his prior marriage.

== Career ==
In 1854 he was appointed to teach in Stonington, Connecticut where he taught for two years. He then moved to Baltimore to work in the high school founded by Rev. Chauncey Leonard. He later established a school in Baltimore, and remained at that school for two years. From 1860 to 1863, Dixon was the principal of a public school in Flushing, Long Island. Around this time he received a license to preach by Rev. William Spellman and in the fall of 1863 he took charge of the Concord Church of Christ at Brooklyn, New York, and was ordained December 17, 1863. He continued to be involved in education, and in 1883, when the Brooklyn Public Schools Board of Education contemplated closing the schools for African American children, Dixon, Charles A. Dorsey, and Rev. Rufus L. Perry led the fight to keep the schools open. With Perry, Dixon was editor in the Printing Department of the Consolidated American Baptist Missionary Convention involved in the printing of numerous newspapers and journals, including Sunbeam, The People's Journal, and The National Monitor.

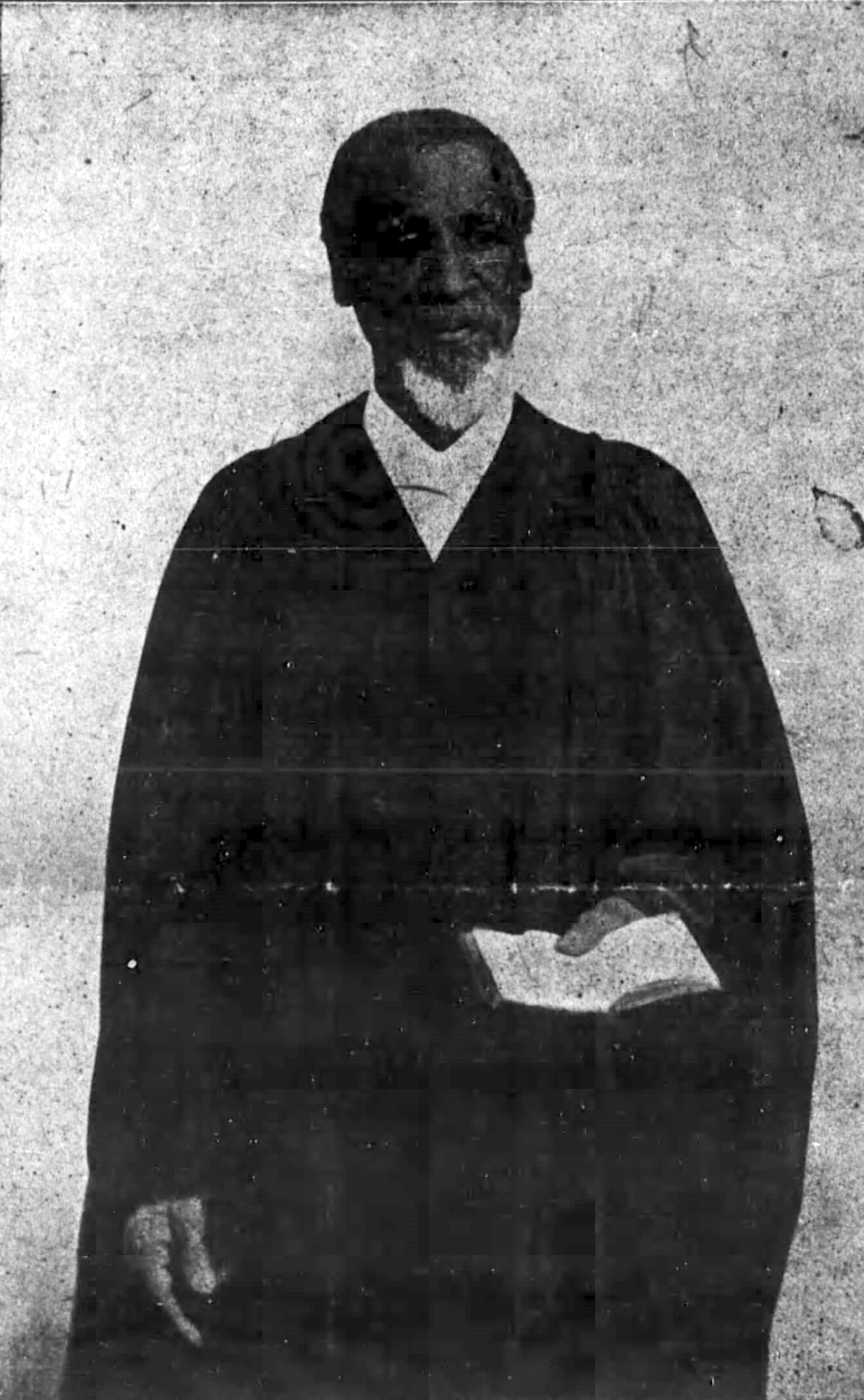
Dixon from his obituary in the New York Age.

Dixon became a leader in the Baptist church. He gave the introductory sermon at an annual meeting of the Long Island Baptist Association. He held offices of president and of corresponding secretary of the Northeast Baptist Missionary Convention. Dixon was one of the original trustees of the Citizen's Union Cemetery Association until 1854, which was then reorganized into the Mount Pleasant Cemetery Association, where he served as secretary. He was a founder of the New England Baptist Association and was elected its president in 1900. He was a member of the American Foreign Anti-Slavery Society. He founded the first black post of the Grand Army of the Republic, a Civil War veterans organization, in about 1879, and was made an honorary member in August 1907. He was a trustee and vice president of the Howard Colored Orphan Asylum. In 1902 he was granted a Doctor of Divinity by State Baptist College in Little Rock, Arkansas.

== Death ==
He died in Brooklyn on June 3, 1909. His funeral at Concord Baptist Church was reportedly attended by 6,000 people. He was buried at Cypress Hills Cemetery.

== Sources ==
- Taylor, Clarence. The Black Churches of Brooklyn. New York: Columbia University Press, 1994.
