= Helen R. Stobbe =

American geologist (1902–1982)

Helen Ruth Stobbe
- Born: 1902; Brooklyn, New York
- Died: September 14, 1982 (aged 79–80)
- Burial place: Cypress Hills Cemetery
- Education: Smith College; Columbia University
- Occupations: Geologist and professor
- Known for: Elected Fellow of the AAAS

Helen R. Stobbe (1902–1982) was an American geologist and professor. She was the only woman on the council of Yellowstone Bighorn Research Association for many years. In 1960, she became an Elected Fellow of the American Association for the Advancement of Science (AAAS).

== Biography ==
Helen Ruth Stobbe was born in 1902 and was a native of Brooklyn, New York.

Stobbe earned her BA at Smith College (1924) and her MA (1931) and PhD (1947) from Columbia University. After earning her bachelor's degree, she taught at Stuart Hall in Staunton, Virginia for two years. She then worked in Columbia's Geology department as an assistant. She joined the faculty of the Smith College Department of Geology and Geography in 1930. In 1953, she was granted a one-year sabbatical from Smith, an opportunity that allowed her to pursue her interests in the geology of the American West. She remained an associate professor of geology and geography at Smith until her retirement in 1967 when she was named an associate professor emeritus.

Stobbe worked for two years for the Amerada Petroleum Corporation (now the Hess Corporation) in New York City. She was the sole woman to hold a position on the council of the Yellowstone Bighorn Research Association, connected to the Princeton Geological Field Camp at Red Lodge, Montana. Based on that experience, she authored "Porphyry Intrusions in the Beartooth Range, Near Red-Lodge, Montana." In 1962, she published "Chromite and other Minerals near Red Lodge, Montana."

In 1956, she co-wrote a paper with Elaine Geisse Murray titled: "A new occurrence of eucolite near Wausau, Marathon County, Wisconsin." Eucolite is a rare mineral that is a variety of the Eudialyte Group.

Stobbe worked as an editor of the Journal of Geological Education as well as the New England section of the National Association of Geology Teachers' Journal of Geological Education. She was also branch and state president of the American Association of University Women and president of the Hampshire County Smith Club.

Helen Ruth Stobbe died at 80 on September 14, 1982. Her funeral was held at St. John's Episcopal Church in Northampton, Massachusetts, and she was buried at Cypress Hills Cemetery in Brooklyn.

== Selected distinctions ==
- Elected Fellow of the American Association for the Advancement of Science (1960)
- State president of the American Association of University Women
- Member of the Geological Society
- Awarded a fellowship for her contributions in the field of mineralogy by the Mineralogical Society of America
- Sustaining member of the Long Beach Biological Association
- Member of Sigma Xi and Phi Beta Kappa
- Smith College maintains an archive of her papers, including coursework, letters, research, photographs, and lecture materials about geology and geography

== Selected publications ==
- Stobbe, Helen. "A brief description of the pegmatites southwest of Custer, South Dakota." Economic Geology 32, no. 7 (1937): 964-973.
- Stobbe, Helen Ruth. "Petrology of volcanic rocks of northeastern New Mexico." Geological Society of America Bulletin 60, no. 6 (1949): 1041–1095.
- Stobbe, Helen. "Porphyry Intrusions In The Beartooth Range, Near Red-Lodge, Montana." In Geological Society of America Bulletin, vol. 63, no. 12, pp. 1300-1300. Assoc Engineering Geologists, Geological Society of America, 1952.
- Stobbe, Helen, and Elaine Geisse Murray. "A new occurrence of eucolite near Wausau, Marathon County, Wisconsin." (1956): 932-935.
- Stobbe, Helen. "Chromite and other Minerals near Red Lodge, Montana." Rocks & Minerals 37, no. 3-4 (1962): 117-124.
