= John B. Wood =

American journalist (1827–1884)

John B. Wood (December 7, 1827 – January 28, 1884) was a 19th-century American journalist from Lebanon, Maine. At various times he was employed by The New York Times, the New York Tribune, The Sun, the New York Herald, and the New York Evening News. He was educated at the Kennebunk Academy until he was sixteen. He entered a printing office where he learned to set type prior to working for several newspapers in Maine and New Hampshire. When he was eighteen Wood journeyed from New York City to Washington, DC to attend the inauguration of President James Knox Polk.

== Career as a journalist ==
In 1847 he established a newspaper, the Thursday Sketcher, in Great Falls, New Hampshire. He ran the newspaper for four years before coming to New York City to report for a number of papers. He set type for the New York Times, a task which was more profitable in this era than reporting. He stayed for four years before he joined the composing room of the New York Tribune. Shifting to the proof-room of the Tribune, Wood was presented with the task of "deciphering the hieroglyphics of Horace Greeley." After several years he left this position to become a full-time correspondent of The Sacramento Union. Following the conclusion of the American Civil War Wood became a reporter for the New York Times and afterward became head of the New York Evening News. He left this post to assume the role of assistant city editor and later night editor of the New York Tribune.

Wood left the Tribune in 1869 to become night editor of The Sun when Charles A. Dana and Isaac W. England took control of the newspaper. He earned a reputation for skilled journalism during his twelve-year tenure at The Sun. With limitations on space he displayed a talent for eliminating unnecessary words and became known as "The Great American Condenser." On weekends Wood served as city editor of the Sunday Mercury. In 1881 he moved from The Sun to the New York Herald to work as a reporter. He was unhappy in this position and left it to become proprietor of the St. Louis Chronicle in St. Louis, Missouri. His final employment was editing the "Sunbeam" column in The Sun.

== Personal life and appearance ==
Wood was a member of the New York Press Club and served as its president in 1878 and 1879. He was a Freemason and was a member of Typographical Union No. 6, of which he was president for several terms. His appearance was "benignant." He was squarely built with broad shoulders and a deep chest. His head was large with a broad forehead and bushy hair sprinkled with gray. Wood had a long white, wavy beard. He resided at No. 67 East Tenth Street in New York City.

== Death ==
Wood died following a fall from a bulkhead between North River Piers No. 3 and 4 at 12:20 a.m. on January 28, 1884 at age 56. He fell a distance of twelve feet, breaking through the ice and sinking to his arms. His fall was witnessed by a man on a canal boat who shouted "Man overboard!" He was taken unconscious by policeman to a bar on West Street and died within fifteen minutes of being taken from the water. He is buried in the Press Club lot in Cypress Hills Cemetery.
