= Thomas Holmes (mortician) =

- Born: c. 1817
- Resting place: Cypress Hills Cemetery, Brooklyn, NY
- Known for: Physician who is considered the father of American embalming

Thomas Holmes (c. 1817–1900) was a mortician who is often thought of as the "father of American embalming".

== Early life ==
He was born in Brooklyn, New York City, in about 1817 to a wealthy merchant. During his childhood he became interested in the medical profession, and (although records from the time are vague and incomplete) is believed to have graduated from the College of Physicians and Surgeons at Columbia University in 1845. His name appears variously in several New York City directories under listings as a Physician and Surgeon from 1847 onwards.

== Study of embalming ==
While at university, Holmes had become concerned with methods of preservation used on cadavers for anatomical study. He complained that preservation was either improperly rendered, ineffectual, or not attempted at all. He also thought that the preservatives used at the time (arsenic-, mercury-, and zinc-based compounds) were injurious to the health of the medical students performing dissections. Later, while studying under a phrenologist, he had the opportunity to examine the heads of a number of Egyptian mummies, and concluded that embalming could be achieved without the use of hazardous compounds.

Immediately prior to the American Civil War, Holmes experimented with arterial embalming based on the earlier work of Jean-Nicolas Gannal of Paris. Through this experimentation, he developed an arterial solution, which went on to be manufactured commercially and was sold for $3.00 per1-US-gallon (3.8 L), and injection apparatus.

== Civil War practice ==
During the Civil War, Holmes was commissioned in the Union army medical corps. Having experimented with embalming procedures previously, he was asked to embalm a few Union soldiers killed in battle so that the remains could be shipped back to their families. Holmes charged $100 per body. Abraham Lincoln eventually sanctioned the treatment for all fallen soldiers and officers, and in four years Holmes embalmed several thousand bodies. He personally claimed to have embalmed, "4028 soldiers and officers, field and staff", although some believe this figure to be inflated.

After the war, Holmes returned to Brooklyn. The widespread use of arterial embalming for fallen soldiers made Holmes' technique widely known, and as a result embalming as part of funeral preparations became more accepted in America.

== Burial ==
Holmes is buried in Cypress Hills Cemetery in Brooklyn. A plaque was erected next to his burial site in 2014 by historian Andrew Carroll.
