= Theodore W. Myers =

American banker and politician (1844–1918)

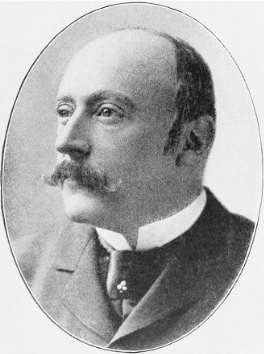
- Born: Theodore Walter Myers; January 11, 1844; New York, New York, US
- Died: March 20, 1918 (aged 74); New York, New York, US
- Occupation: Banker
- Political party: Democratic
- Spouses: Rosalie Hart (m. 1870; died 1909) Rose Alexis Knight (m. 1915)

Theodore Walter Myers (January 11, 1844 – March 20, 1918) was a Jewish-American banker who served as New York City Comptroller.

== Life ==
Myers was born on January 11, 1844, in New York City, New York, the son of Lawrence Myers. His father was a prominent importer of wines.

Myers attended private schools in New York City, France, and Germany to prepare for college, although ill health led him to give up on attending college. During the American Civil War, he helped organize the Sickles Brigade and served as captain of its Third Regiment for a time. He was later connected to the City Guard for many years and served as captain of the Ninth Regiment of the National Guard of the State of New York. In 1864, he began his financial career by joining the banking and brokerage firm Polhemus & Jackson. After a few years apprenticing there he became a member of the new firm Camblos & Myers. When the partnership dissolved several years later, he worked in the business under his own name. He also spent several years as a special partner in the house of M. E. DeRivas & Co. and travelled abroad for a year or two. In 1886, he organized the banking firm Theodore W. Myers & Co., with himself as its head.

An active Democrat, in the 1884 presidential election Myers organized the Cleveland and Hendricks Stock Exchange Campaign Club and arranged a large rally for the Democratic Party on the steps of the Subtreasury Building on Wall Street. In May 1887, Mayor Abram Hewitt appointed him a member of the Park Commission. He was elected treasurer of the Commission shortly afterwards. In November 1887, he was the United Democracy candidate for New York City Comptroller and won the election ahead of the ticket. He proved so satisfactory as Comptroller that in the 1890 election County Democracy, Tammany Hall, and the Republican Party all nominated him for re-election. At the end of his second term the Citizens' Movement and the Good Government Club urged him to run again only for him to decline another nomination. Shortly after his term ended he was unanimously elected president of the Business Men's Democratic Association of New York. As Comptroller, he negotiated a fourteen million dollar loan for the city at the unprecedentedly low interest rate of two and a half percent.

In 1898, Myers became head of Theodore W. Myers & Co., a banking firm with branches in Boston, Philadelphia, Baltimore, Chicago, and other cities. He retired in 1902, although he later became a special partner of Arthur Lipper & Co. In 1900, there were rumors Charles Murphy was going to select him to be the Democratic candidate for Mayor of New York City.

Myers attended Congregation Shearith Israel, which his father served as trustee of for many years. He was a member of the Manhattan Club, the Reform Club, the Democratic Club, the New York Club, the Rockaway Hunting Club, the New York Athletic Club, the New York Hunting Club, the New Amsterdam Club, and the Thirteen Club. In 1870, he married Rosalie Hart, the granddaughter of prominent merchant and New York Stock Exchange founder Bernard Hart. They had one child, George L. Rosalie died, and in 1915 he married Rose Alexis Knight of Boston in a ceremony performed by Rabbi Rudolph Grossman.

Myers died at home from heart disease on March 20, 1918. The funeral was held at his home, with Rabbi Henry Pereira Mendes of Congregation Shearith Israel conducting the service. A number of notable political and business leaders attended the funeral. He was buried in Cypress Hills Cemetery.
