= Leo Merzbacher =

German-American rabbi

Leo Merzbacher (March 16, 1809 – October 21, 1856) was a German-American rabbi who ministered in New York City. He was the first ordained rabbi in New York City and the first Reform rabbi in America.

== Life ==
Merzbacher was born on March 16, 1809, in Fürth, Bavaria, the son of Salman and Rachel Merzbacher. His father ran a small grocery store. His mother died when he was two, after which his father married her sister Dina.

Merzbacher's father, a small grocery store operator, sent him to Moses Sofer in Pressburg, where he received a rabbinical degree. Bavarian law at the time required rabbis seeking a pulpit in the country to attend a university and submit to official examination, so in 1830 he registered in the University of Erlangen as a student in philosophy and theology. His registration was held up so he could finish matriculation from a high school. He successfully passed the examination after studying at either the University of Erlangen or the Ludwig-Maximilians-Universität München, but later research suggested he never received a higher degree from either university. He immigrated to America and settled in New York City in around 1841. By 1842, he delivered the dedication sermon at the opening ceremony of Congregation Rodeph Sholom.

Merzbacher served as a teacher at Rodeph Sholom, and in 1843 Ansche Chesed appointed him preacher and teacher. The congregation didn't renew his appointment after he gave a sermon criticizing the practice of married women covering their hair. This led his supporters in the congregation, including its president Isaac Dittenhoefer, to combine with the Cultus Verein, a society of young German Jews unrelated to any congregation. Together, they established the first Reform congregation in New York City, Congregation Emanu-El, in 1845, with Merzbacher as its rabbi. He gave sermons in German, organized a religious school, installed an organ, and, in 1848, introduced the confirmation ceremony for boys and girls. An active member of B'nai B'rith, he was credited with suggesting its name and prepared its first burial ritual. He was also involved in the founding of the Independent Order of True Sisters.

Merzbacher suffered from tuberculosis, which made it increasingly difficult for him to fulfill his rabbinic duties. He was ordered by Emanu-El's board of directors to write a prayer book in 1849, but he didn't complete it for another six years. The directors declared the pulpit vacant due to his poor health in 1852, although he opposed this declaration with a strongly worded letter. In 1855, the directors instructed him to prepare his sermons in manuscript and leave them lying on the pulpit when he delivered them. A few months later, they resolved to advertise for an assistant minister, although Merzbacher opposed the resolution and no assistant was hired by the time he died.

On October 21, 1856, Merzbacher was walking home from Emanu-El after leading the morning service of Simchat Torah when he died from a pulmonary hemorrhage. His funeral was held at his home and was attended by New York City's German elite and members by various congregations, but not by the trustees, rabbis, and chazans of the Orthodox synagogues. The pallbearers were officers of the B'nai B'rith Grand Lodge. At one point at least 800 people were in the funeral procession, and stores owned by congregation members that were on the procession's route were closed and draped in black. 400 people proceeded to the cemetery, where Rabbi David Einhorn of Har Sinai Congregation in Baltimore, B'nai B'rith Chaplain Henry Jones, Rabbi Maurice Mayer of Congregation Beth Elohim in Charleston, and Rabbi Elkan Cohn of Albany delivered addresses. He was buried at Cypress Hills Cemetery.
