= Caples Jefferson Architects =

American design and architecture firm

- Founded: 1987
- Founder: Sara Caples and Everardo Jefferson
- Headquarters: Long Island City, Queens, New York, United States
- Website: www.capjeff.com

Caples Jefferson Architects is an American design and architecture firm founded in 1987 in New York City by principal architects Sara Caples and Everardo Jefferson. The firm focuses on architecture in a public, cultural and community context, and is unique for its dedication to designing approximately half of its projects in communities underserved by the design profession.

== Biography ==
Sara Caples attended Smith College and received a Master of Architecture from Yale University. She has taught at schools of architecture at CCNY, Syracuse, and University of Miami. Everardo Jefferson attended Pratt Institute and received a Master of Architecture at Yale University. He has taught at schools of architecture at Columbia and Syracuse. Caples and Jefferson were invited to teach as the Louis I. Kahn Visiting Assistant Professors at Yale University in Fall 2015. Between 2019 and 2026, Jefferson was appointed Commissioner at the New York City Landmarks Preservation Commission.

The firm has garnered numerous awards, including the AIANY President's Award 2017, AIA New York State Firm of the Year in 2012, NYC MWBE Firm of the Year in 2009 and was a Mies van der Rohe Crown Hall Prize of the Americas nominee. Jefferson was the 2020 recipient of the Rowena Award, designated by the Rowena Reed Kostellow Fund at Pratt Institute. In 2024, Sara Caples and Everardo Jefferson were inducted as Academicians to the National Academy of Design. In 2026, the firm was awarded Architect's Newspaper's Best of Practice for the Small Firm Category in the Northeast.

== Work ==
Caples Jefferson's body of work includes projects: Louis Armstrong Center, Weeksville Heritage Center, Queens Theater in the Park addition and renovation, Marcus Garvey Community Center, Motion Pictures Editor's Guild, Heritage Health & Housing Headquarters, Columbia University's Starr East Asian library renovation.

The Louis Armstrong Center is a cultural and educational facility in Corona, Queens, New York, designed by Caples Jefferson Architects and completed in 2023. Developed as an expansion of the Louis Armstrong House Museum, the 14,000-square-foot building houses archival materials documenting the life and career of jazz musician Louis Armstrong, exhibition spaces, educational facilities, and the 75-seat Jazz Room for performances and public programs. The center features Here to Stay, an exhibition curated by musician and artist Jason Moran, and provides space for research, interpretation, and community engagement. The building's design includes a prominent entrance canopy and a contemporary facade that establishes a public presence within the surrounding residential neighborhood. The project received LEED Silver certification.

Weeksville Heritage Center is a cultural center and urban design project that was completed in 2014 in Crown Heights, Brooklyn. The elegant new Modern structure is a two-story, 23,000 sq ft space that includes art exhibition, performance, education facilities, offices and green spaces for staff, visitors and the local community. The L-shaped building frames the historic houses that once belonged to 19th-century African-American freedmen. It is certified LEED Gold, and includes geothermal wells, and storm water gathering and percolation on site. Weeksville Heritage Center has been awarded multiple awards, such as AIA New York State's Design Excellence Award 2014 & Best in New York State 2014, Municipal Art Society's Best New Building 2014, Historic Districts Council’s Design Award 2014, and Chicago Athenaeum's American Architecture Award 2014.

In The Architect Newspaper, Allen Blake notes that "Caples Jefferson has performed an art of architectural archeology, excavating, revealing and framing history through spatial expression. […] [Weeksville] is a visual and sensory interplay between past and present."

In 2010, Caples Jefferson Architects completed a 600 person reception room by the Queens Theatre in the Park, an addition to the 1964 New York World's Fair Site in Queens, New York. The project features a transparent "nebula room" which looks out upon the large observation towers surrounding it. "The 'transparent "nebula room' allows visitors to view the observatory towers...the reception room's festive atmosphere is created by the rich color palette derived from the area's culturally diverse surroundings." This project received several awards including the 2010 New York Construction Cultural Project of the Year, a Queens Chamber of Commerce Award, a National Organization of Minority Architects (NOMA) National Award of Excellence in Architecture as well as the 2011 MASterworks Award for Best Restoration by the Municipal Art Society.

Projects in construction or in design include: The Africa Center, Louis Armstrong House Museum, ongoing Columbia University projects, ongoing New York City School Construction Authority projects, and ongoing US Department of State projects.

== Selected design and renovation projects ==
Museums

- The Africa Center, New York, NY 2027 (Projected)
- Louis Armstrong Museum Center, New York, NY 2023
- Weeksville Heritage Center, Brooklyn, NY 2014

Educational Institutions

- 10 Bouck Court Pre-Kindergarten, Brooklyn NY 2016
- New York University, Faculty Housing, Bleecker Street, New York NY 2016
- Jonas Bronck Academy expansion, Bronx, NY, 2023
- NYU Warren Weaver Cogen Plant, New York, NY 2004 (Masterplan)
- Columbia University Main Campus Scoping Documents, New York, NY 2014
- 1337 Inwood Charter School, Bronx, NY 2015
- Marshak Science Building (HVAC upgrade), City College of New York, City University of New York, New York, NY, 2014
- Life Sciences Building (upgrade), SUNY Stony Brook, New York, NY 2012
- Neighborhood Charter School of Harlem, New York, NY 2012
- Starr East Asian Library renovation, New York, NY 2009
- NYU Warren Weaver Cogen Plant, New York, NY 2004 (Masterplan)
- Hybrid School - Stephen Gaynor, New York, NY 2002 (Project)
- Grace Church School renovation, New York, 2002
- Child Care Center, Borough of Manhattan Community College, New York, 2002
- Howard Haber Blue Feather School interior design, Bronx, NY 1993
- Jennie Knauff Children’s Center, Bronx, NY 1991

Theatres

- Queens Theatre in the Park (addition of reception hall), Queens, NY 2009
- Apollo Theater (renovation), Harlem, New York 2002

Community centers

- Marcus Garvey Community Center, Brooklyn, NY 2011
- Cooper Park Community Center renovation, Brooklyn, NY 1997
- Taylor-Wythe Community Center renovation, Brooklyn, NY 1997
- Williamsburg Community Center, New York, NY 1997

Religious centers

- Todos Los Santos, Jamaica, NY, 2022
- New Spirit Café (restaurant), New York, NY 2000

Treatment centers

- Central Harlem Alcohol Crisis Center, New York, NY 1995 (Project)

Urban design and infrastructure

- NYU Warren Weaver Cogen Plant preliminary design, New York, NY 2004 (Masterplan)
- Lehman Maintenance Building, New York, New York 1996

Offices

- Heritage Health and Housing HQ, New York, NY 2002
- DeSimone Consulting Engineers, New York, NY 1997
- Motion Picture Editors Guild (renovation), New York, NY 1999

Industrial

- Estee Lauder Cogeneration Plant, 2000 (Project)

Residential

- 691 St. Nicholas Avenue, New York, NY 2016
- Intergen Senior Housing, Chicago, Illinois 2006 (Project)
- Three Generations House, New York, NY 1996
- Sutton Residence, New York, NY 1995
- Olivebridge, Olivebridge, NY 1991
- House in Vermont, Greensboro, VT 1975

== Awards ==
- Built By Women, Louis Armstrong Center, 2026
- Architect's Newspaper Best of Practice, Best Small Firm in the Northeast, 2026
- Mies van der Rohe Crown Hall Americas Prize, Nominee, 2024
- National Medal for Museum and Library Service, the Institute of Museum and Library Services (IMLS), 2024
- 2nd place, Institutional, Cultural, Government, Urban Design and Planning, AIA Queens Design Award, 2024
- Entertainment, NYCxDESIGN Award presented by Interior Design Magazine, 2024
- AIA Archi Award Long Island, Commendation, 2023
- Rowena Award, Rowena Reed Kostellow Fund at Pratt Institute, 2020
- AIA NY President's Award, 2017
- The City of New York City Council Citation Weeksville Heritage Center, 2015
- Built By Women New York City Award Weeksville Heritage Center, 2015
- AIA NY COTE Institutional Award Weeksville Heritage Center, 2015
- Chicago Atheneum American Architecture Award, 2014
- AIA New York State Best in New York State, 2014
- AIA New York State Design Award of Excellence, 2014
- MASterworks Award, Best New Building, Municipal Art Society, 2014
- Historic Districts Council, Design Award, 2014
- Mies van der Rohe Crown Hall Americas Prize Nominee, 2014
- Building Brooklyn Awards, Best New Civic/Institutional Building, 2014
- Architect Magazine Annual Design Review Best Cultural Project Citation, 2013
- NOMA Honor Award for Excellence, 2013
- Architect Magazine Top 50 Sustainable Firms, 2013
- AIA New York State Firm of the Year, 2012
- MASterworks Award for Best Restoration, Municipal Art Society, 2011 (Project)
- AIL Design Award with special citation Best Use of Color, 2011
- Cultural Project of the Year, New York Construction, 2010
- CWB Design Portfolio Award, 2010
- City of New York MWBE of the Year, 2009
- First Prize Award for Excellence in Design, Queens Chamber of Commerce, 2008
- NOMA National Awards for Excellence in Architecture, 2004, 2008, and 2009
- NY Chapter AIA Design Awards Citations, 1995, 1996, 2006 and 2007
- New York City Art Commission Design Award, 2006
- NY Chapter AIA Honor Award for Architecture 2004
- AIA National Honor Award for Architecture, 2003
- New New York 3, Architectural League of New York, 2002
- Emerging Voice, Architectural League of New York, 1998
