= Howard Colored Orphan Asylum =

New York City orphanage (1866–1918)

Coordinates: 40.6761°N 73.9360°W

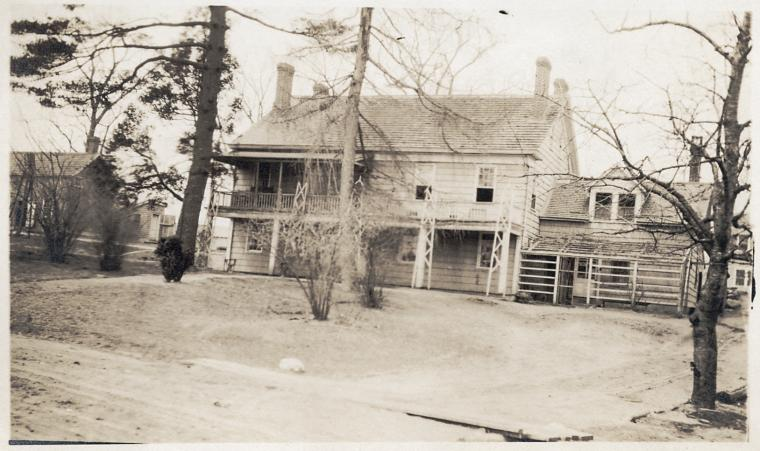
- Howard Orphanage and Industrial School, c. 1915
- Formation: 1866
- Founder: Henry M. Wilson; Sarah A. Tillman; Oliver Otis Howard
- Dissolved: 1918
- Headquarters: Weeksville, Brooklyn, New York City, U.S.
- Formerly called: Home for Freed Children and Others; Howard Orphanage and Industrial School

The Howard Colored Orphan Asylum was one of the few orphanages to be led by and for African Americans. It was located on Troy Avenue and Dean Street in Weeksville, a historically black settlement in what is now Crown Heights, Brooklyn, New York City. The asylum gradually deteriorated due to lack of funding, and closed in 1918 after an incident involving burst water pipes, which resulted in two students contracting frostbite and having their feet amputated. It was also known as Home for Freed Children and Others, and later known as the Howard Orphanage and Industrial School.

== History ==
The Home for Freed Children and Others was founded in 1866 by black Presbyterian minister Henry M. Wilson, black widow Sarah A. Tillman, and white general Oliver Otis Howard. It was originally used by freedwomen new to the northern United States as a place for their children while they searched for work. Their children were used as indentured servants to white and black families for a small payment going to the child in return. While it had some financial support from white patrons—namely Gen. Howard, for whom it is named—the orphanage was staffed and managed primarily by African Americans. Wilson was a member of the African Civilization Society which supported organizations and schools for African Americans. By 1868, the institution's finances were in disarray due to Wilson's mismanagement.

In 1888, it was renamed the Howard Colored Orphan Asylum and moved to Brooklyn with Rev. William Francis Johnson (c.1820–1903), a blind preacher who was active in the struggle for equal rights, as the Superintendent. Under Johnson's leadership, the institution frequently obtained donations from Black churches, Black speakers, and more coverage in the news, creating close ties to the Black community. In the 1890s, the institution moved away from the indentured system to train students in industrial education to prepare them for the practical world of labor, business, and agriculture but which would limit formal studies. This led to the Hampton Institute recommending that four-fifths of the students should be engaged in institutional training and Booker T. Washington was tapped to secure funding from leading philanthropists. An annex was built first, and in 1899, a campaign was organized by Rufus L. Perry to build a school on an adjacent lot with funds secured from the state. In 1902, it was discovered that Johnson greatly mismanaged the orphanage's funds which spurred an investigation by the New York Comptroller and a grand jury. Johnson left the institution following the investigation in 1902, and the board of directors reorganized itself to include more white males, rather than African Americans and women. The demographic reorganization was done at the suggestion of the New York Comptroller in order to obtain more white donors. Rev. Powhattan E. Bagnall (also written Powhatan Bagnall) was elected as superintendent by the board as a replacement for Johnson.

=== Ota Benga ===
In September 1906, Congolese pygmy Ota Benga (aged about 23) was exhibited in the Monkey House of the Bronx Zoo. Controversy quickly ensued, and many prominent African American leaders, including Superintendent James H. Gordon, objected to the exhibit. By September 29, Benga was transferred to the Howard Colored Orphan Asylum where he was given a room to himself and treated as a visitor.

== Howard Orphanage and Industrial School ==
In 1908, the institution was renamed Howard Orphanage and Industrial School, and a white Quaker, L. Hollingsworth Wood, was named as its president. In 1910, the State Board of Charities deemed the Brooklyn location unsafe as a result of an investigation charging the institution with unsanitary conditions. Billed as the "Tuskegee of the North", the orphanage moved 250 children from the Brooklyn location to a 572-acre (231 ha) farm in Kings Park, Long Island, to teach practical skills in 1911. The property had originally consisted of two large farms and later converted into a similar educational experiment for Jewish people to move away from tailoring and sweatshop occupations on the Lower East Side to agriculture, but the project later failed. Upon founding, Howard Orphanage and Industrial School planned to utilize the four existing cottages to house the 200 children with plans of building more cottages to house upwards of 1,000 pupils once funds could be secured. In 1913, Washington visited the school writing favorably of the experience.

== Closure and legacy ==
By the mid-1910s, the institution was again in dire need of more funding to house greater numbers of orphans due to the influx of people moving north for work during World War I. In 1917, a committee that included George Foster Peabody, Oswald Garrison Villard and W.E.B. DuBois was formed to campaign for $100,000. However, by the end of the year, the campaign ended, unable to secure the funds in the midst of the war. Lack of funds and war shortages contributed to the institution's low coal supply and inability to repair burst pipes due to freezing temperatures. Following one incident where pipes froze and burst in January 1918, two students contracted frostbite and had to receive foot amputations after they warmed up their feet at the kitchen stoves. After the incident, the Commissioner of Charities, Victor F. Ridder, closed the institution. Ridder indicted the institution, but a Suffolk County grand jury declined to find the asylum guilty of negligence. The farm became property of W. P. Anderson, Commissioner of Agriculture for Russia who transformed it into an agricultural school for Russian boys.

Upon its closure, trustees began using leftover funds to pay tuition for Black students in Brooklyn. In 1956, the student organization was renamed the Howard Memorial Fund.

== See also ==
- Colored Orphan Asylum
