= Cypress Hills Cemetery =

Cemetery in New York City

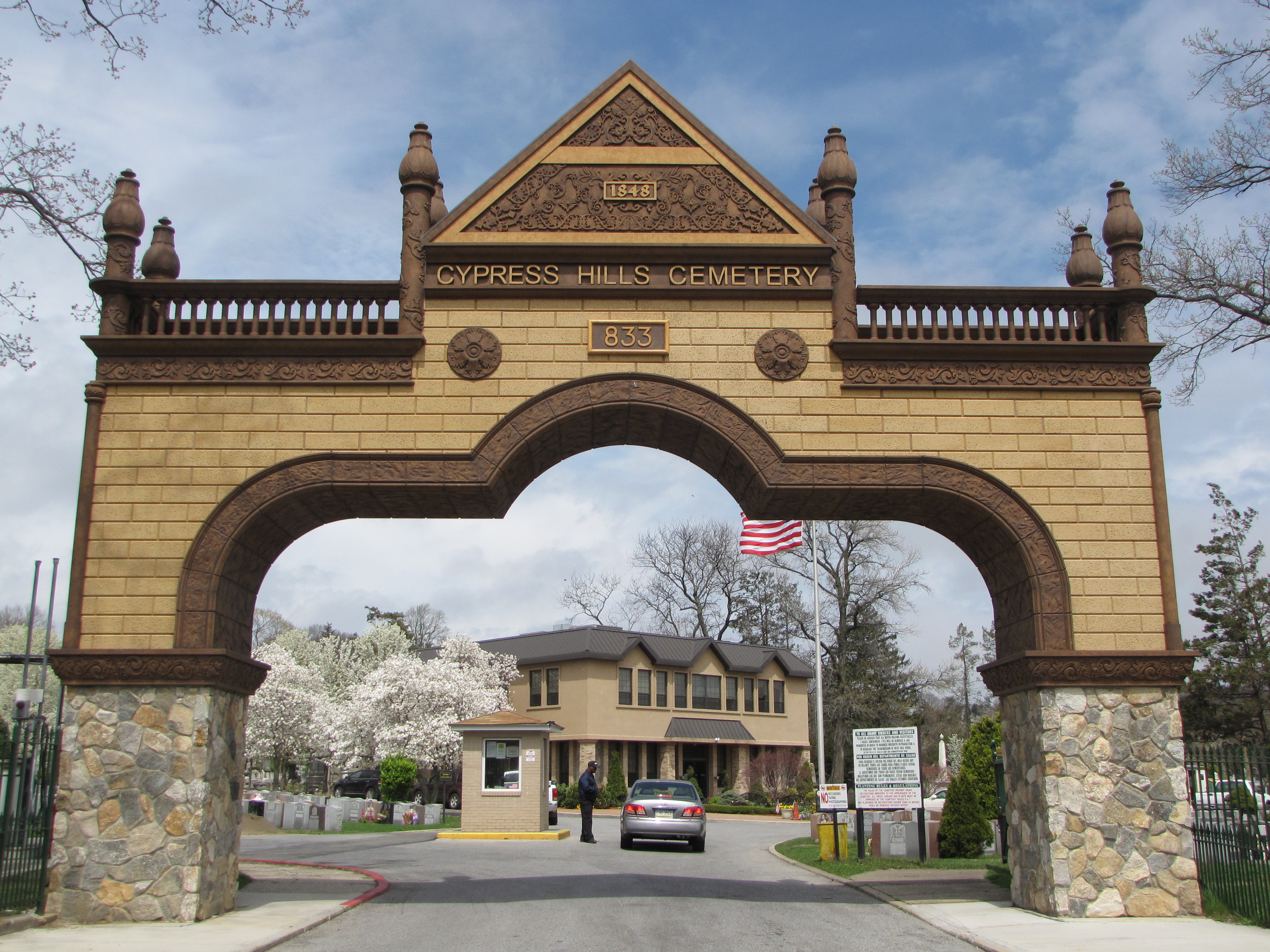
- Main entrance of the Cypress Hills Cemetery
- Interactive map of Cypress Hills Cemetery

Details
- Established: 21 November 1848
- Location: 833 Jamaica Avenue, New York City
- Country: United States
- Coordinates: 40.6962812°N 73.8768394°W
- Type: Private, non-denominational
- Style: Rural cemetery
- Size: 225 acres (91 ha)
- No. of interments: Over 400,000
- Website: https://www.cypresshillscemetery.org/

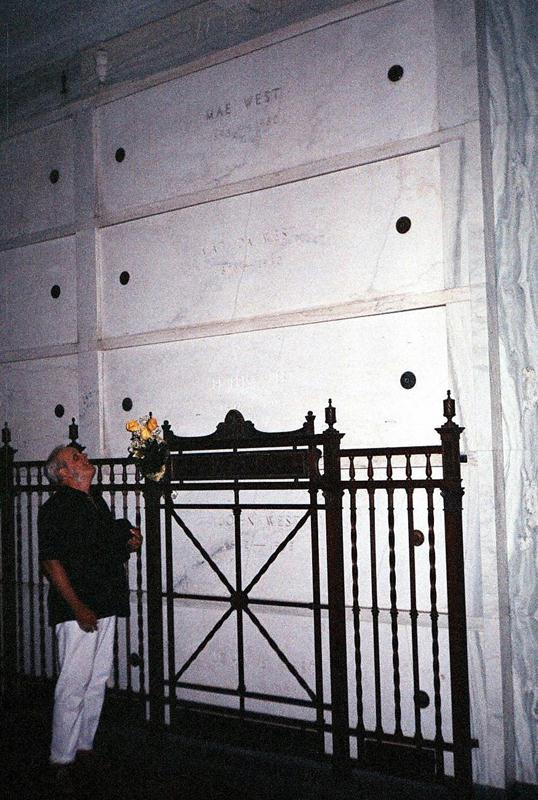
At Mae West's tomb

Cypress Hills Cemetery is a non-sectarian/non-denominational cemetery corporation organized in the boroughs of Brooklyn and Queens in New York City, United States. The first of its type in the city, the cemetery is run as a non-profit organization and is located at 833 Jamaica Avenue in Brooklyn in the Cemetery Belt on the border of both boroughs. Its 225 acres (91 ha) are divided by the Jackie Robinson Parkway. Cypress Hills Cemetery retains its two primary entrances at Jamaica Avenue (Cypress Hills, Brooklyn) and Cooper Avenue (Glendale, Queens). Cemetery of the Evergreens lies directly to the southwest.

== History ==
=== 19th century ===
Dedicated on November 21, 1848, east of the Ridgewood Reservoir, Cypress Hills Cemetery was opened for burials in 1851 and was designed in the rural cemetery style popular at the time. While most burials had previously taken place in or near religious establishments, growing public health concern about burial as a source of disease led to the Rural Cemetery Act and the creation of large rural cemeteries such as Cypress Hills Cemetery within the "Cemetery Belt". The initial board of trustees consisted of Abraham H. Van Wyck, Caleb S. Woodwell, C. Edwards Lester, Charles Miller, Luther R. Marsh, Edwin Williams, and Christian Delavan.

A portion of the northwest area of the cemetery was designated as the Cypress Hills National Cemetery in 1862 as a military burial ground for soldiers of the American Civil War. A total of 3,425 Union soldiers were buried there, in addition to 478 Confederate soldiers who died while prisoners of war. In 1941 it received the bodies of 235 Confederate prisoners who died on Hart Island.

139 soldiers from the Spanish–American War were re-interred at Cypress Hills Cemetery from Montauk Point in 1899.

=== 20th century ===
In 1902, during the construction of the Interboro Parkway through Cypress Hills, charges were laid of gross mismanagement by trustees who re-elected themselves each year without oversight, and who received a large income from the sale of burial plots but did not spend any of this on improvements to the cemetery. At this point, 150,000 bodies were buried at Cypress Hills Cemetery. A resolution was passed to create a State Senate committee to investigate these matters.

In the late 20th century, a period of mismanagement and controversy led to declaration of bankruptcy. Scandal erupted in 1998 when it was revealed that a section of the cemetery was built on unstable landfill; the cemetery had constructed the Terrace Meadow hill on landfill as a way to increase burial space and appeal to customers who sought burial plots on a hill with a good view. The New York State Supreme Court ruled that the area was unstable and all graves had to be moved.

In 2003, charges were laid by Ravi Batra, one of its former court-appointed guardians, who accused another of trying to seize control by quietly installing one of his own employees as president of the cemetery's re-formed board of directors in a bid to gain control of the 200-acre (0.81 km^{2}) cemetery.

The cemetery serves as the final resting place for over 400,000 individuals. The history of Cypress Hills Cemetery is featured in the book Images of America: Cypress Hills Cemetery by Stephen C. Duer and Allen B. Smith.

== Features ==
The cemetery is located on 225 acres (91 ha) of land. Its individual features include:

- Cypress Hills Abbey, built in 1926
- Memorial Abbey, built in 1936
- Melrose Memorial Garden, built in 2008
- An urn garden
- War of 1812 Memorial
- Civil War Soldiers plot
- One Commonwealth war grave of Private Fred Wilshear, a World War I soldier of the British Army Labour Corps

== Notable interments ==
- Vytautas Bacevičius (1905–1970), Lithuanian pianist and composer
- Captain Wynn Bagnall MC (1890–1931), the inspiration behind a statue by James Earle Fraser in Canada
- Eubie Blake (1887–1983), musician and composer
- Nixzmary Brown (1998–2006), abused child and murder victim
- Homer Lusk Collyer (1881–1947), recluse and hoarder
- Langley Collyer (1885–1947), recluse and hoarder
- James J. Corbett (1866–1933), World Heavyweight boxing champion
- Hiram Cronk (1800–1905), last surviving veteran of the War of 1812
- William T. Dixon (1833–1909), Baptist minister
- Mock Duck (1879–1941), New York Chinese Chinatown gang leader
- Monk Eastman (1873–1920), notorious New York gang leader
- Lee Falk (1911–1999), cartoonist, creator of The Phantom
- Bob "Death to Flying Things" Ferguson (1845–1894), major league baseball player and manager
- Kate Fox (1837–1892), spiritualist
- Maggie Fox (1833–1893), spiritualist
- Dr. Thomas Holmes, physician who is considered the father of American embalming
- Irving Lehman (1876–1945), Chief Judge of the New York State Court of Appeals
- Henry S. Jacobs (1827–1893), rabbi
- Philip J. Joachimsen (1817–1890), lawyer and New York Marine Court Judge
- George Leonidas Leslie (1842–1878) architect, bank robber
- Rosetta Lenoire (1911–2002), actress, National Medal of the Arts winner
- Samuel Liebmann (1799–1872), German-born brewer
- Wenjian Liu (1982–2014), New York City police officer, slain during the December 2014 killings of NYPD officers
- Leo Merzbacher (1809–1856), rabbi
- Piet Mondrian (1872–1944), Dutch painter
- Anna Mooney Burch (died 1905), American soprano
- Victor Moore (1876–1962), actor, comedian
- Pauli Murray (1910–1985), American civil rights activist, advocate, legal scholar and theorist, author and an Episcopal priest
- Theodore W. Myers (1844–1918), banker and New York City Comptroller
- Jackie Robinson (1919–1972), Hall of Fame baseball player, the first African-American player in the major leagues
- Rufus L. Perry (1834–1895), journalist, Baptist minister
- Arturo Alfonso Schomburg (1874–1938), founder of the Schomburg Center for Research in Black Culture, New York City
- Capital Steez (1993–2012) former member of Pro Era, Founder of Beast coast movement
- Junius Brutus Stearns (1810–1885), painter
- Helen R. Stobbe, (1902–1982), geologist and professor
- Mae West (1893–1980), actress, comedian, and playwright
- Josh White (1914–1969), musician
- John B. Wood (1827–1884), journalist
- Elisa Izquierdo (1989-1995)

== See also ==
- List of United States cemeteries
- Rural Cemetery Act
