= John Godfrey (cricketer) =

English cricketer

Personal information
- Full name: John Frederick Godfrey
- Born: 18 August 1917; Garsington, Oxfordshire, England
- Died: October 1995 (aged 78); Newton Abbot, Devon, England
- Batting: Right-handed
- Bowling: Right-arm fast-medium

Domestic team information
- Years: Team
- 1939–1947: Hampshire
- 1939–1949: Oxfordshire
- 1950–1954: Cambridgeshire

Career statistics
Competition	First-class
Matches	12
Runs scored	61
Batting average	4.35
100s/50s	–/–
Top score	25*
Balls bowled	1,462
Wickets	15
Bowling average	50.20
5 wickets in innings	–
10 wickets in match	–
Best bowling	4/116
Catches/stumpings	1/–
- Source: Cricinfo, 13 February 2010

John Frederick Godfrey (18 August 1917 — October 1995 ) was an English first-class cricketer.

Godfrey was born in August 1917 at Garsington, Oxfordshire. He made his debut in first-class cricket for Hampshire against the touring West Indians at Bournemouth in 1939. It is likely that he was not qualified by residency to play for Hampshire in the County Championship prior to the Second World War. Prior to the war, he also played minor counties cricket for Oxfordshire, making three appearances in the Minor Counties Championship. Godfrey served during the Second World War with the Royal Artillery, being commissioned as a second lieutenant in October 1941, before being made a war substantive lieutenant in September 1944.

Following the war, he resumed playing county cricket. Having presumably qualified to represent Hampshire in the County Championship, he made ten County Championship appearances across 1946 and 1947, in addition to playing against Cambridge University at Portsmouth in 1947. In twelve first-class matches for Hampshire, he took 15 wickets with his right-arm fast-medium bowling at an average of 50.20, with best figures of 4 for 116. He resumed his minor counties participation with Oxfordshire in 1948, representing the county in a further eleven Minor Counties Championship matches. In 1950, he began playing minor counties cricket for Cambridgeshire, making 41 appearances in the Minor Counties Championship to 1954. As a bowler, he was better accustomed to minor counties level, taking 207 wickets for Cambridgeshire and 46 for Oxfordshire at averages both under 20. In the army, Godfrey relinquished his commission in January 1952, at which point he was serving with the Royal Warwickshire Regiment. He died at Newton Abbot in October 1995.
