= Philip J. Joachimsen =

German-American judge and lawyer

Philip J. Joachimsen (November 26, 1817 – January 6, 1890) was a German-born Jewish-American lawyer and judge from New York.

== Life ==
Joachimsen was born on November 26, 1817 in Breslau, Prussia. He immigrated to America when he was a child.

Joachimsen lived in New York City, New York and studied law in the offices of Clinton & Kane, Samuel Meredith, and John L. Lawrence. He was then admitted to the bar, and in 1840 he was appointed Assistant Corporation Counsel of New York City. In 1855, he was appointed Assistant United States District Attorney and, under a special provision of an Act of Congress, Substitute United States Attorney. While serving in that office, he secured the first conviction of smuggling, the first capital conviction for slave-trading, and the conviction of the Nicaragua filibusters and violators of Neutrality Laws during the Crimean War. United States Attorney General Caleb Cushing, with President Franklin Pierce's direction, officially conveyed the government's thanks to Joachimsen for his abilities in discharging his duties. He tendered his resignation due to differences that grew out of the Kansas-Nebraska question and returned to his law practice.

When the American Civil War began, Joachimsen organized the 59th New York Infantry Regiment and went to the front with the regiment as Lieutenant Colonel. He was appointed United States Paymaster and was stationed at Fortress Monroe. He was later assigned to New Orleans under Benjamin F. Butler. He was seriously injured by falling from his horse and was ordered to return to New York for treatment. He was then honorably discharged from his military service and was made Brevet Brigadier General by Governor Reuben Fenton. He was elected judge of the New York Marine Court in 1870. He served as judge until 1877, at which point he returned to his law practice.

An active member of New York City's Jewish community, Joachimsen was president of the Hebrew Benevolent Society in 1855, the first president of the Hebrew Orphan Asylum in 1859, an organizer of the Hebrew Sheltering Guardian Society for Children in New York in 1879 and chairman of its advisory board, vice-president of the Hebrew Young Men's Fuel Association in 1850, and honorary counsel of the Home for Infirm and Indigent Hebrews in 1871. He attended Congregation Shearith Israel. He was a member of B'nai B'rith and the Freemasons. He regularly included to, among other publications, the New Yorker Staats-Zeitung, the Albany Law Journal, and The Jewish Messenger. He also wrote historical and legal papers, including Historical Vindication of a Martyrized Jew Against John Lothrop Motley, which discussed the innocence of the Elizabethan Jewish physician Roderigo Lopes. His wife was Carolina C., a poet who was an assistant editor of the Philadelphia Jewish Record and president of the Home for Infirm and Indigent Hebrews. They had a son and a daughter, with the daughter being the wife of Morris Goodhart.

Joachimsen died at home on January 6, 1890. Rabbi Henry Pereira Mendes officiated the funeral at his home. Judges, lawyers, and members of Hebrew societies attended the funeral, including ex-Judge Charles P. Daly, Judge Rufus B. Cowing, Recorder Frederick Smyth, Coroner Ferdinand Levy, Judge M. C. Gross, Rabbi Frederick de Sola Mendes, Rabbi Kaufmann Kohler, Judge David McAdam, Judge Ehrlich, Assemblyman Joseph Blumenthal, ex-Judge Donahue, and Rabbi Moses Maisner. He was buried in Cypress Hills Cemetery.
