= Weeksville, Brooklyn =

Neighborhood in Brooklyn, New York

External videos
- A Day in Weeksville: Brooklyn's Historic, Free Black Town
- WEEKSVILLE WAS A FREE BLACK COMMUNITY IN BROOKLYN, NEW YORK

Map of Weeksville

Weeksville is a historic neighborhood founded by free African Americans in Brooklyn. After the completion of the Brooklyn Bridge, rapid urbanization caused Weeksville to be forgotten until it was rediscovered and preserved by historian James Hurley. Today, it is part of the present-day neighborhood of Crown Heights.

== History ==
Weeksville was named after James Weeks, a freed African-American stevedore from Virginia. In 1838, 11 years after the final abolition of slavery in New York State, Weeks bought a plot of land from Henry C. Thompson, a free African American and land investor, in the Ninth Ward of central Brooklyn. Thompson had acquired the land from Edward Copland, a politically-minded European American and Brooklyn grocer, in 1835. Previously, Copland bought the land from an heir of John Lefferts, a member of one of the most prominent and land-holding families in Brooklyn. There was ample opportunity for land acquisition during this time, as many prominent land-holding families sold off their properties during an intense era of land speculation. Many African-Americans saw land acquisition as their opportunity to gain economic and political freedom by building their own communities.

The village itself was established by a group of African-American land investors and political activists as an intentional land-owning community. It covered an area in the borough's eastern Bedford Hills area, bounded by present-day Fulton Street, East New York Avenue, Ralph Avenue and Troy Avenue. A 1906 article in The New York Age recalling an earlier period noted that James Weeks "owned a handsome dwelling at Schenectady and Atlantic Avenues."

By the 1850s, Weeksville had more than 500 residents from all over the East Coast (as well as two people born in Africa). Almost 40 percent of residents were southern-born. Weeksville was the second-largest free Black community in the United States in pre-Civil War America. Nearly one-third of the men over 21 owned land; in antebellum New York, unlike in New England, non-white men had to own real property (to the value of $250) and pay taxes on it to qualify as voters. The village had its own churches (including Bethel Tabernacle African Methodist Episcopal Church and the Berean Missionary Baptist Church), a school ("Colored School no. 2", now P.S. 243), a baseball team, a cemetery, and an old age home. Weeksville had one of the first African-American newspapers, the Freedman's Torchlight, and in the 1860s became the national headquarters of the African Civilization Society and the Howard Colored Orphan Asylum. In addition, the Colored School was the first such school in the U.S. to integrate both its staff and its students.

During the violent New York Draft Riots of 1863, the community served as a refuge for many African-Americans who fled from Manhattan.

After the completion of the Brooklyn Bridge in 1883, and as New York City grew and expanded, Weeksville gradually became part of Crown Heights, and memory of the village was largely forgotten.

James Hurley was interviewed about the rediscovery process in 2011.

== Rediscovery of Weeksville and the Hunterfly Road Houses ==
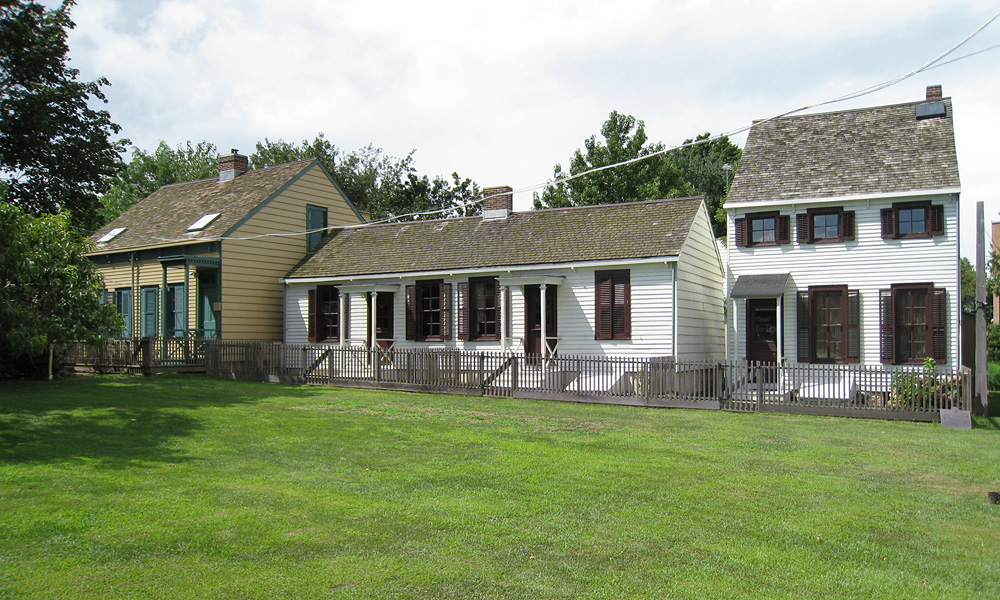
Three of the four Hunterfly Road houses

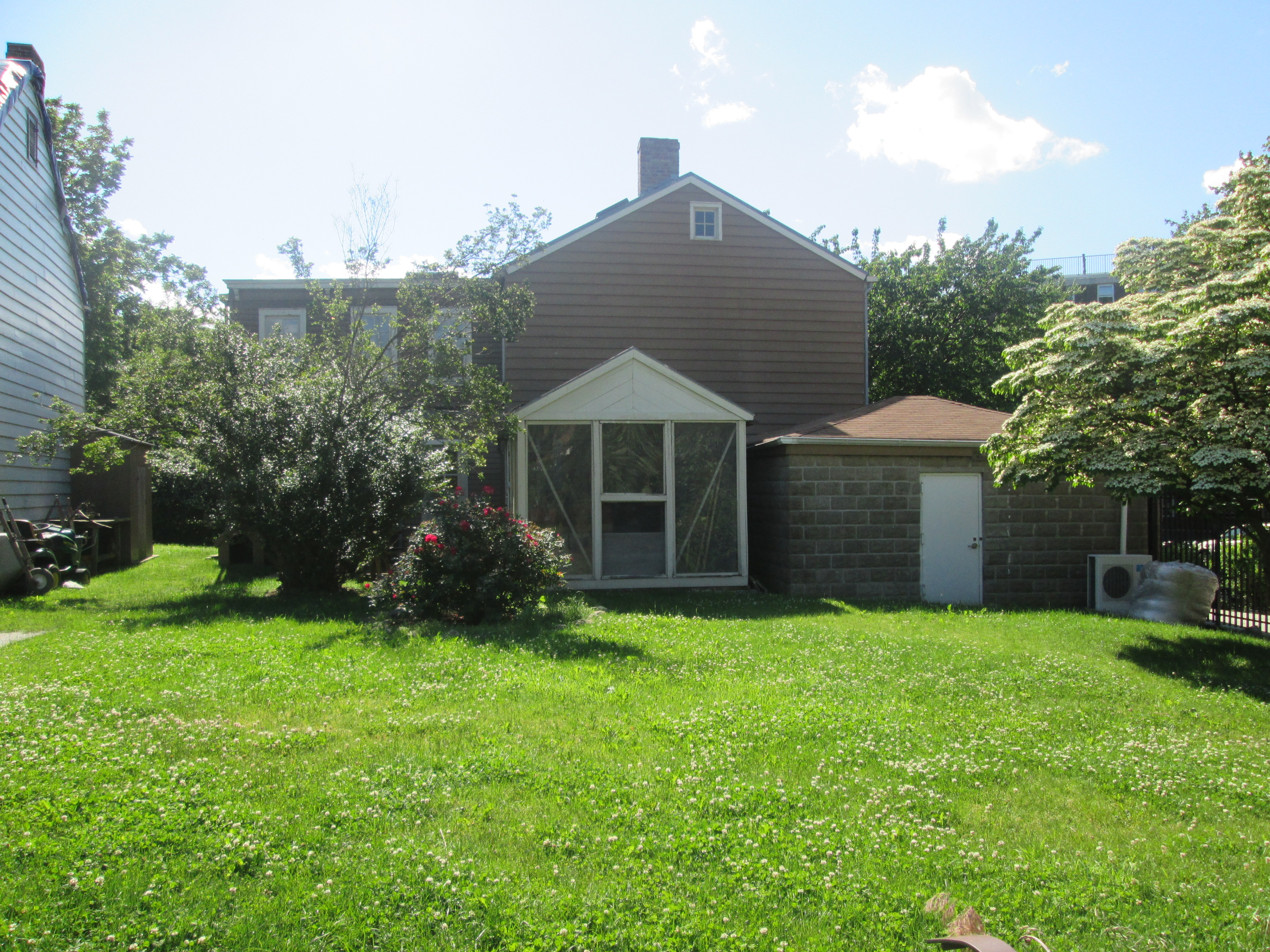
The fourth house

The search for Historic Weeksville began in 1968 in a Pratt Institute workshop on Brooklyn and New York City neighborhoods led by historian James Hurley. After reading of Weeksville in The Eastern District of Brooklyn, a 1912 book by Brooklyn historian Eugene Armbruster, Hurley and Joseph Haynes, a local resident and pilot, consulted old maps and flew over the area in an airplane in search of surviving evidence of the village.

Four historic houses (now known as the Hunterfly Road Houses) were discovered off Bergen Street between Buffalo and Rochester Avenues, facing an old lane—a remnant of Hunterfly Road, which was at the eastern edge of the 19th century village.

== Weeksville today ==
Weeksville is currently a majority Black neighborhood (61%), while 19% of its residents identify as Latino. 26% of its population is immigrants from Latin America and the Caribbean.

== Weeksville Heritage Center ==
The 1968 discovery of the Hunterfly Road Houses led to the formation of The Society for the Preservation of Weeksville and Bedford-Stuyvesant History (now the Weeksville Heritage Center). Joan Maynard was a founding member and executive director for the Preservation of Weeksville and Bedford-Stuyvesant History. The preservation of the Hunterfly Road Houses became her life's work.

In 1970 the houses were declared New York City Landmarks, and in 1972 were placed on the National Register of Historic Places as the Hunterfly Road Historic District. The houses were purchased by the Society in 1973, and in 2005, following a $3 million restoration, the houses reopened to the public as the Weeksville Heritage Center, with each house showcasing a different era of Weeksville history. Construction of a 19,000-square-foot (1,800 m^{2}) education and cultural center adjacent to the houses was completed in 2014.
