= National Association of Geoscience Teachers =

North American organization

- Founded: 1938
- Type: Professional Organization
- Location: Northfield, United States
- Region served: Canada, United States
- Method: Conferences, Publications, Training
- Members: 1,377
- Key people: Anne Egger, Executive Director
- Employees: .
- Website: www.nagt.org

The National Association of Geoscience Teachers (NAGT) is a North American organization that seeks to foster improvement in the teaching of the earth sciences at all levels of formal and informal instruction, to emphasize the cultural significance of the earth sciences, and to disseminate knowledge in this field to the general public.

== Members ==
Members include K-12 teachers and college and university faculty as well as educators working with the general public through outlets such as museums and science centers.

== Awards ==
Association awards include the Outstanding Earth Science Teacher award, the Neil Miner award, the James H. Shea award, and summer field programs.

== Publications ==
Association publications:

- In the Trenches
- Journal of Geoscience Education (formerly the Journal of Geological Education)
- Lab Manual in Physical Geology
- Living with Earth

== Training ==
The NAGT/USGS Cooperative Summer Field Training Program was established in 1965 and is one of the longest continuing science internship programs in the country. Over 2,200 students have participated in this program from its inception.
