= J. Sella Martin =

American abolitionist (1832–1876)

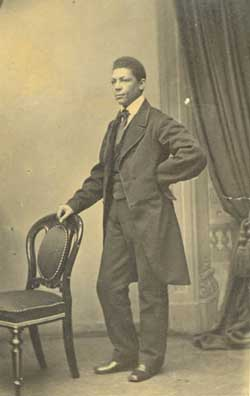
- Born: John Sella Martin; September 27, 1832; Charlotte, North Carolina, US
- Died: August 11, 1876 (aged 43); New Orleans, Louisiana, US
- Occupations: Pastor; abolitionist
- Spouse: Sarah Ann Lattimore (m. 1858)
- Children: 2

John Sella Martin (September 27, 1832 – August 11, 1876) escaped slavery in Alabama and became an influential abolitionist and pastor in Boston, Massachusetts. He was an activist for equality before the American Civil War and travelled to Britain to lecture against slavery. When he returned, he preached in Presbyterian churches in Washington, D.C.

After the American Civil War, Martin returned to the South, working during the Reconstruction era in education in Alabama and Mississippi. A Republican, he became a politician in Louisiana and in 1872 was elected to the state legislature from Caddo Parish. In that year, the gubernatorial election was fiercely disputed, and the state legislature was ultimately taken over by the Democrats, en route to regaining control of the state government. Martin had an appointed position with the US Post Office and also wrote for the Louisianian newspaper.

== Early years ==
John Sella Martin was born into slavery in 1832 in Charlotte, North Carolina. His mother was a slave, and his father was her white master. Under the principle of partus sequitur ventrem, adopted by Virginia in 1662 and later other colonies in slave law, children of slave mothers took her status and were born into slavery, regardless of who their father was and what proportion of European ancestry they had. This gave rise to many mixed-race slaves, some of majority-white ancestry. At the age of six Martin, his mother and his only sister were taken to Columbus, Georgia where they were sold. His mother and sister were purchased by one man and John Sella Martin was purchased by a free black man named Horace King.

His new owner was an old bachelor. Martin served him in the capacity of a valet de chambre until the age of eighteen. They resided together in one of the principal hotels in Columbus, and Martin was given the opportunity to learn how to read and write, as well as be exposed to a more worldly view (as opposed to being an agricultural worker). He met travelers from throughout the United States and Canada staying at the hotel, as well as their servants.

=== False freedom ===
When Martin was sixteen his owner went blind, and Martin was entrusted with helping him carry out his personal affairs; he gave the youth a home-school type education. When his master died, Martin (then eighteen), was set free by his will. But his master's relatives successfully contested the will, forcing Martin to remain in bondage. They had him sold during settlement of the estate, and he was taken to Mobile, Alabama.

== Escape to new life ==
After escaping slavery in Alabama in 1856 at the age of 24, Martin made his way to the North, reaching Canada. He finally settled in Boston, Massachusetts, considered a center of freedom for blacks. It had a strong, biracial abolitionist movement. In 1859 he gave an eloquent speech lifting up John Brown as a martyr like Jesus Christ and a warrior for freedom whose fight he compared to battles fought during the American Revolution.

He entered the ministry and became minister of the First Independent Baptist Church (1860–1862) in the Beacon Hill section of that city. He was active in the abolitionist movement and worked to achieve equality of the races. He and his wife lived at 26 Myrtle Street. She helped the Fugitive Aid Society in support of escaped slaves.

Martin was well received by abolitionist leaders and admired for his speaking skills.

He was selected to represent the American Missionary Association in England, where he lectured widely in London against slavery and helped raise funds for the education of African Americans. In 1863, J. Sella Martin was appointed pastor of the free Christian Church in Bow, East London. He was a founding member of the English Freedman's Aid Society, and was instrumental in founding many of its local chapters. On his return, he joined the Presbyterian Church and was a popular preacher in Washington, DC.

After the American Civil War, Martin returned to the South, working in education in Alabama and Mississippi. He went into politics in Louisiana. In 1872 he was elected to the state legislature as a fusion candidate from Caddo Parish, Louisiana under Governor-elect John McEnery. In that year, the gubernatorial election was so fiercely disputed that the federal government had to get involved, deciding in favor of the Republican candidate, William Pitt Kellogg. The state legislature had several seats that were contested; Kellogg ultimately took control and Martin, who was never sworn in, lost his seat. Martin was appointed as an agent of the US Post Office, and also wrote for the Louisianian newspaper.

== Marriage and family ==
In 1858, Martin married Sarah Ann Lattimore of Saratoga Springs, New York. They had two children: a son, Horace, who died at the age of four months in April 1861, and a daughter, Josephine Sarah, born in Boston, March 9, 1863.

=== Martin's death ===
Martin died in New Orleans, Louisiana in 1876 by an overdose of laudanum, which he was known to use for "his nerves". He left no suicide note, so it was not known if the overdose was accidental or intentional. He had developed a drinking problem in his later years, and was reported to be unemployed and despondent at the time of his death. He left behind a wife and a daughter. He had a national reputation and his death was covered sympathetically by The New York Times.

After Martin's death, Sarah Ann Martin moved to Washington, D.C., where she worked as a teacher. Josie, who had also worked in the District as a teacher, on December 27, 1883, married barber Cyrus Fabius Martin (no relation), a Civil War veteran from Dowagiac, Michigan. They would eventually have four children.

Sarah Ann Martin died in Washington on May 26, 1891. Josephine Sarah Martin divorced her husband in 1909, and with her youngest daughter moved to Chicago, Illinois, where she married Dr. Graham Sharp, a chiropodist. They subsequently moved to Los Angeles, California, where she died on October 18, 1947.
